

73001–73100 

|-bgcolor=#fefefe
| 73001 ||  || — || March 10, 2002 || Anderson Mesa || LONEOS || — || align=right | 1.6 km || 
|-id=002 bgcolor=#fefefe
| 73002 ||  || — || March 10, 2002 || Anderson Mesa || LONEOS || — || align=right | 4.9 km || 
|-id=003 bgcolor=#fefefe
| 73003 ||  || — || March 10, 2002 || Anderson Mesa || LONEOS || — || align=right | 1.5 km || 
|-id=004 bgcolor=#E9E9E9
| 73004 ||  || — || March 9, 2002 || Socorro || LINEAR || — || align=right | 2.9 km || 
|-id=005 bgcolor=#fefefe
| 73005 ||  || — || March 9, 2002 || Socorro || LINEAR || FLO || align=right | 1.5 km || 
|-id=006 bgcolor=#d6d6d6
| 73006 ||  || — || March 9, 2002 || Socorro || LINEAR || — || align=right | 4.0 km || 
|-id=007 bgcolor=#E9E9E9
| 73007 ||  || — || March 9, 2002 || Socorro || LINEAR || — || align=right | 1.6 km || 
|-id=008 bgcolor=#fefefe
| 73008 ||  || — || March 9, 2002 || Socorro || LINEAR || — || align=right | 1.3 km || 
|-id=009 bgcolor=#fefefe
| 73009 ||  || — || March 9, 2002 || Socorro || LINEAR || — || align=right | 3.0 km || 
|-id=010 bgcolor=#fefefe
| 73010 ||  || — || March 12, 2002 || Socorro || LINEAR || V || align=right | 1.4 km || 
|-id=011 bgcolor=#E9E9E9
| 73011 ||  || — || March 12, 2002 || Socorro || LINEAR || — || align=right | 3.6 km || 
|-id=012 bgcolor=#fefefe
| 73012 ||  || — || March 13, 2002 || Socorro || LINEAR || — || align=right | 2.1 km || 
|-id=013 bgcolor=#fefefe
| 73013 ||  || — || March 11, 2002 || Palomar || NEAT || V || align=right | 1.1 km || 
|-id=014 bgcolor=#fefefe
| 73014 ||  || — || March 9, 2002 || Socorro || LINEAR || — || align=right | 1.4 km || 
|-id=015 bgcolor=#fefefe
| 73015 ||  || — || March 13, 2002 || Kitt Peak || Spacewatch || — || align=right | 3.1 km || 
|-id=016 bgcolor=#fefefe
| 73016 ||  || — || March 13, 2002 || Socorro || LINEAR || NYS || align=right | 3.4 km || 
|-id=017 bgcolor=#fefefe
| 73017 ||  || — || March 13, 2002 || Socorro || LINEAR || — || align=right | 1.3 km || 
|-id=018 bgcolor=#fefefe
| 73018 ||  || — || March 13, 2002 || Socorro || LINEAR || — || align=right | 1.5 km || 
|-id=019 bgcolor=#fefefe
| 73019 ||  || — || March 13, 2002 || Socorro || LINEAR || MAS || align=right | 1.5 km || 
|-id=020 bgcolor=#fefefe
| 73020 ||  || — || March 13, 2002 || Socorro || LINEAR || NYS || align=right | 1.2 km || 
|-id=021 bgcolor=#fefefe
| 73021 ||  || — || March 13, 2002 || Socorro || LINEAR || — || align=right | 1.3 km || 
|-id=022 bgcolor=#fefefe
| 73022 ||  || — || March 13, 2002 || Socorro || LINEAR || — || align=right | 1.3 km || 
|-id=023 bgcolor=#fefefe
| 73023 ||  || — || March 13, 2002 || Socorro || LINEAR || — || align=right | 2.0 km || 
|-id=024 bgcolor=#fefefe
| 73024 ||  || — || March 13, 2002 || Socorro || LINEAR || NYS || align=right | 3.9 km || 
|-id=025 bgcolor=#fefefe
| 73025 ||  || — || March 13, 2002 || Socorro || LINEAR || — || align=right | 2.2 km || 
|-id=026 bgcolor=#fefefe
| 73026 ||  || — || March 13, 2002 || Socorro || LINEAR || NYS || align=right | 1.5 km || 
|-id=027 bgcolor=#fefefe
| 73027 ||  || — || March 11, 2002 || Kitt Peak || Spacewatch || NYS || align=right | 1.8 km || 
|-id=028 bgcolor=#E9E9E9
| 73028 ||  || — || March 11, 2002 || Kitt Peak || Spacewatch || — || align=right | 1.7 km || 
|-id=029 bgcolor=#fefefe
| 73029 ||  || — || March 10, 2002 || Haleakala || NEAT || FLO || align=right | 1.3 km || 
|-id=030 bgcolor=#E9E9E9
| 73030 ||  || — || March 10, 2002 || Haleakala || NEAT || — || align=right | 4.8 km || 
|-id=031 bgcolor=#E9E9E9
| 73031 ||  || — || March 12, 2002 || Palomar || NEAT || — || align=right | 1.7 km || 
|-id=032 bgcolor=#fefefe
| 73032 ||  || — || March 12, 2002 || Palomar || NEAT || — || align=right | 1.2 km || 
|-id=033 bgcolor=#fefefe
| 73033 ||  || — || March 13, 2002 || Palomar || NEAT || — || align=right | 1.5 km || 
|-id=034 bgcolor=#fefefe
| 73034 ||  || — || March 13, 2002 || Palomar || NEAT || NYS || align=right | 1.5 km || 
|-id=035 bgcolor=#E9E9E9
| 73035 ||  || — || March 9, 2002 || Socorro || LINEAR || — || align=right | 4.7 km || 
|-id=036 bgcolor=#fefefe
| 73036 ||  || — || March 9, 2002 || Socorro || LINEAR || NYS || align=right | 1.4 km || 
|-id=037 bgcolor=#fefefe
| 73037 ||  || — || March 9, 2002 || Socorro || LINEAR || — || align=right | 2.1 km || 
|-id=038 bgcolor=#E9E9E9
| 73038 ||  || — || March 9, 2002 || Socorro || LINEAR || — || align=right | 2.6 km || 
|-id=039 bgcolor=#fefefe
| 73039 ||  || — || March 12, 2002 || Socorro || LINEAR || NYS || align=right | 1.5 km || 
|-id=040 bgcolor=#fefefe
| 73040 ||  || — || March 13, 2002 || Socorro || LINEAR || — || align=right | 2.3 km || 
|-id=041 bgcolor=#fefefe
| 73041 ||  || — || March 14, 2002 || Socorro || LINEAR || — || align=right | 1.4 km || 
|-id=042 bgcolor=#fefefe
| 73042 ||  || — || March 14, 2002 || Socorro || LINEAR || — || align=right | 1.7 km || 
|-id=043 bgcolor=#fefefe
| 73043 ||  || — || March 12, 2002 || Socorro || LINEAR || — || align=right | 2.1 km || 
|-id=044 bgcolor=#fefefe
| 73044 ||  || — || March 15, 2002 || Socorro || LINEAR || FLO || align=right | 3.9 km || 
|-id=045 bgcolor=#E9E9E9
| 73045 ||  || — || March 9, 2002 || Anderson Mesa || LONEOS || RAF || align=right | 2.1 km || 
|-id=046 bgcolor=#E9E9E9
| 73046 Davidmann ||  ||  || March 9, 2002 || Catalina || CSS || — || align=right | 1.8 km || 
|-id=047 bgcolor=#fefefe
| 73047 ||  || — || March 10, 2002 || Kitt Peak || Spacewatch || — || align=right | 1.3 km || 
|-id=048 bgcolor=#fefefe
| 73048 ||  || — || March 10, 2002 || Anderson Mesa || LONEOS || — || align=right | 1.9 km || 
|-id=049 bgcolor=#fefefe
| 73049 ||  || — || March 10, 2002 || Anderson Mesa || LONEOS || — || align=right | 2.6 km || 
|-id=050 bgcolor=#E9E9E9
| 73050 ||  || — || March 11, 2002 || Haleakala || NEAT || — || align=right | 3.6 km || 
|-id=051 bgcolor=#d6d6d6
| 73051 ||  || — || March 12, 2002 || Anderson Mesa || LONEOS || — || align=right | 7.8 km || 
|-id=052 bgcolor=#E9E9E9
| 73052 ||  || — || March 12, 2002 || Socorro || LINEAR || MIS || align=right | 4.1 km || 
|-id=053 bgcolor=#fefefe
| 73053 ||  || — || March 13, 2002 || Palomar || NEAT || — || align=right | 1.7 km || 
|-id=054 bgcolor=#fefefe
| 73054 ||  || — || March 15, 2002 || Kitt Peak || Spacewatch || NYS || align=right | 1.9 km || 
|-id=055 bgcolor=#E9E9E9
| 73055 || 2002 FG || — || March 16, 2002 || Desert Eagle || W. K. Y. Yeung || — || align=right | 5.2 km || 
|-id=056 bgcolor=#fefefe
| 73056 ||  || — || March 19, 2002 || Desert Eagle || W. K. Y. Yeung || FLO || align=right | 1.4 km || 
|-id=057 bgcolor=#E9E9E9
| 73057 ||  || — || March 19, 2002 || Desert Eagle || W. K. Y. Yeung || ADE || align=right | 4.7 km || 
|-id=058 bgcolor=#fefefe
| 73058 ||  || — || March 20, 2002 || Desert Eagle || W. K. Y. Yeung || — || align=right | 2.1 km || 
|-id=059 bgcolor=#fefefe
| 73059 Kaunas ||  ||  || March 16, 2002 || Moletai || K. Černis, J. Zdanavičius || — || align=right | 1.5 km || 
|-id=060 bgcolor=#fefefe
| 73060 ||  || — || March 16, 2002 || Socorro || LINEAR || — || align=right | 1.3 km || 
|-id=061 bgcolor=#fefefe
| 73061 ||  || — || March 16, 2002 || Socorro || LINEAR || V || align=right | 2.0 km || 
|-id=062 bgcolor=#fefefe
| 73062 ||  || — || March 16, 2002 || Socorro || LINEAR || FLO || align=right | 1.4 km || 
|-id=063 bgcolor=#fefefe
| 73063 ||  || — || March 16, 2002 || Socorro || LINEAR || NYS || align=right | 1.6 km || 
|-id=064 bgcolor=#E9E9E9
| 73064 ||  || — || March 16, 2002 || Socorro || LINEAR || EUN || align=right | 1.8 km || 
|-id=065 bgcolor=#fefefe
| 73065 ||  || — || March 16, 2002 || Haleakala || NEAT || — || align=right | 1.8 km || 
|-id=066 bgcolor=#fefefe
| 73066 ||  || — || March 16, 2002 || Haleakala || NEAT || V || align=right | 5.3 km || 
|-id=067 bgcolor=#E9E9E9
| 73067 ||  || — || March 20, 2002 || Socorro || LINEAR || — || align=right | 1.8 km || 
|-id=068 bgcolor=#fefefe
| 73068 ||  || — || March 20, 2002 || Socorro || LINEAR || — || align=right | 1.9 km || 
|-id=069 bgcolor=#E9E9E9
| 73069 ||  || — || March 20, 2002 || Socorro || LINEAR || — || align=right | 6.1 km || 
|-id=070 bgcolor=#E9E9E9
| 73070 ||  || — || March 20, 2002 || Kitt Peak || Spacewatch || — || align=right | 1.5 km || 
|-id=071 bgcolor=#fefefe
| 73071 ||  || — || March 23, 2002 || Socorro || LINEAR || — || align=right | 1.8 km || 
|-id=072 bgcolor=#fefefe
| 73072 ||  || — || March 30, 2002 || Palomar || NEAT || — || align=right | 1.9 km || 
|-id=073 bgcolor=#fefefe
| 73073 Jannaleuty ||  ||  || April 4, 2002 || Emerald Lane || L. Ball || — || align=right | 2.0 km || 
|-id=074 bgcolor=#fefefe
| 73074 ||  || — || April 9, 2002 || Socorro || LINEAR || — || align=right | 1.8 km || 
|-id=075 bgcolor=#fefefe
| 73075 ||  || — || April 9, 2002 || Socorro || LINEAR || H || align=right | 1.7 km || 
|-id=076 bgcolor=#fefefe
| 73076 ||  || — || April 9, 2002 || Socorro || LINEAR || H || align=right | 1.5 km || 
|-id=077 bgcolor=#fefefe
| 73077 ||  || — || April 10, 2002 || Socorro || LINEAR || H || align=right | 1.1 km || 
|-id=078 bgcolor=#E9E9E9
| 73078 ||  || — || April 4, 2002 || Palomar || NEAT || — || align=right | 5.0 km || 
|-id=079 bgcolor=#fefefe
| 73079 Davidbaltimore ||  ||  || April 14, 2002 || Palomar || NEAT || PHO || align=right | 2.1 km || 
|-id=080 bgcolor=#d6d6d6
| 73080 ||  || — || April 15, 2002 || Desert Eagle || W. K. Y. Yeung || — || align=right | 5.4 km || 
|-id=081 bgcolor=#fefefe
| 73081 ||  || — || April 15, 2002 || Desert Eagle || W. K. Y. Yeung || V || align=right | 1.3 km || 
|-id=082 bgcolor=#fefefe
| 73082 ||  || — || April 15, 2002 || Socorro || LINEAR || NYS || align=right | 1.7 km || 
|-id=083 bgcolor=#E9E9E9
| 73083 ||  || — || April 15, 2002 || Socorro || LINEAR || — || align=right | 1.8 km || 
|-id=084 bgcolor=#fefefe
| 73084 ||  || — || April 15, 2002 || Socorro || LINEAR || — || align=right | 1.7 km || 
|-id=085 bgcolor=#E9E9E9
| 73085 ||  || — || April 15, 2002 || Socorro || LINEAR || — || align=right | 5.9 km || 
|-id=086 bgcolor=#fefefe
| 73086 ||  || — || April 15, 2002 || Socorro || LINEAR || FLO || align=right | 4.4 km || 
|-id=087 bgcolor=#fefefe
| 73087 ||  || — || April 15, 2002 || Socorro || LINEAR || — || align=right | 2.5 km || 
|-id=088 bgcolor=#fefefe
| 73088 ||  || — || April 15, 2002 || Socorro || LINEAR || — || align=right | 2.2 km || 
|-id=089 bgcolor=#fefefe
| 73089 ||  || — || April 14, 2002 || Socorro || LINEAR || — || align=right | 1.7 km || 
|-id=090 bgcolor=#fefefe
| 73090 ||  || — || April 14, 2002 || Socorro || LINEAR || — || align=right | 2.1 km || 
|-id=091 bgcolor=#fefefe
| 73091 ||  || — || April 14, 2002 || Socorro || LINEAR || — || align=right | 1.6 km || 
|-id=092 bgcolor=#E9E9E9
| 73092 ||  || — || April 14, 2002 || Socorro || LINEAR || EUN || align=right | 3.7 km || 
|-id=093 bgcolor=#fefefe
| 73093 ||  || — || April 14, 2002 || Socorro || LINEAR || — || align=right | 2.2 km || 
|-id=094 bgcolor=#fefefe
| 73094 ||  || — || April 14, 2002 || Socorro || LINEAR || — || align=right | 2.0 km || 
|-id=095 bgcolor=#fefefe
| 73095 ||  || — || April 14, 2002 || Socorro || LINEAR || V || align=right | 1.3 km || 
|-id=096 bgcolor=#fefefe
| 73096 ||  || — || April 14, 2002 || Socorro || LINEAR || MAS || align=right | 1.3 km || 
|-id=097 bgcolor=#fefefe
| 73097 ||  || — || April 14, 2002 || Socorro || LINEAR || — || align=right | 1.7 km || 
|-id=098 bgcolor=#E9E9E9
| 73098 ||  || — || April 14, 2002 || Socorro || LINEAR || — || align=right | 2.1 km || 
|-id=099 bgcolor=#fefefe
| 73099 ||  || — || April 14, 2002 || Socorro || LINEAR || V || align=right | 1.4 km || 
|-id=100 bgcolor=#fefefe
| 73100 ||  || — || April 14, 2002 || Socorro || LINEAR || — || align=right | 1.6 km || 
|}

73101–73200 

|-bgcolor=#fefefe
| 73101 ||  || — || April 14, 2002 || Socorro || LINEAR || — || align=right | 2.1 km || 
|-id=102 bgcolor=#fefefe
| 73102 ||  || — || April 15, 2002 || Palomar || NEAT || FLO || align=right | 1.7 km || 
|-id=103 bgcolor=#fefefe
| 73103 ||  || — || April 13, 2002 || Kitt Peak || Spacewatch || — || align=right | 1.1 km || 
|-id=104 bgcolor=#E9E9E9
| 73104 ||  || — || April 12, 2002 || Socorro || LINEAR || — || align=right | 4.2 km || 
|-id=105 bgcolor=#E9E9E9
| 73105 ||  || — || April 12, 2002 || Socorro || LINEAR || — || align=right | 6.1 km || 
|-id=106 bgcolor=#fefefe
| 73106 ||  || — || April 14, 2002 || Socorro || LINEAR || — || align=right | 1.5 km || 
|-id=107 bgcolor=#fefefe
| 73107 ||  || — || April 14, 2002 || Socorro || LINEAR || — || align=right | 2.3 km || 
|-id=108 bgcolor=#fefefe
| 73108 ||  || — || April 2, 2002 || Kitt Peak || Spacewatch || — || align=right | 1.6 km || 
|-id=109 bgcolor=#fefefe
| 73109 ||  || — || April 2, 2002 || Palomar || NEAT || V || align=right | 1.7 km || 
|-id=110 bgcolor=#fefefe
| 73110 ||  || — || April 2, 2002 || Kitt Peak || Spacewatch || — || align=right | 1.3 km || 
|-id=111 bgcolor=#fefefe
| 73111 ||  || — || April 4, 2002 || Palomar || NEAT || NYS || align=right | 1.8 km || 
|-id=112 bgcolor=#fefefe
| 73112 ||  || — || April 4, 2002 || Palomar || NEAT || — || align=right | 1.3 km || 
|-id=113 bgcolor=#fefefe
| 73113 ||  || — || April 4, 2002 || Kitt Peak || Spacewatch || MAS || align=right | 1.5 km || 
|-id=114 bgcolor=#fefefe
| 73114 ||  || — || April 4, 2002 || Haleakala || NEAT || V || align=right | 1.6 km || 
|-id=115 bgcolor=#fefefe
| 73115 ||  || — || April 4, 2002 || Haleakala || NEAT || V || align=right | 1.4 km || 
|-id=116 bgcolor=#fefefe
| 73116 ||  || — || April 4, 2002 || Palomar || NEAT || — || align=right | 1.8 km || 
|-id=117 bgcolor=#fefefe
| 73117 ||  || — || April 5, 2002 || Anderson Mesa || LONEOS || NYS || align=right | 1.2 km || 
|-id=118 bgcolor=#fefefe
| 73118 ||  || — || April 5, 2002 || Anderson Mesa || LONEOS || — || align=right | 1.5 km || 
|-id=119 bgcolor=#fefefe
| 73119 ||  || — || April 5, 2002 || Anderson Mesa || LONEOS || — || align=right | 2.4 km || 
|-id=120 bgcolor=#fefefe
| 73120 ||  || — || April 5, 2002 || Palomar || NEAT || V || align=right | 1.5 km || 
|-id=121 bgcolor=#fefefe
| 73121 ||  || — || April 5, 2002 || Palomar || NEAT || V || align=right | 1.4 km || 
|-id=122 bgcolor=#E9E9E9
| 73122 ||  || — || April 8, 2002 || Palomar || NEAT || BRG || align=right | 4.1 km || 
|-id=123 bgcolor=#fefefe
| 73123 ||  || — || April 8, 2002 || Palomar || NEAT || V || align=right | 1.4 km || 
|-id=124 bgcolor=#E9E9E9
| 73124 ||  || — || April 8, 2002 || Socorro || LINEAR || EUN || align=right | 3.6 km || 
|-id=125 bgcolor=#E9E9E9
| 73125 ||  || — || April 8, 2002 || Palomar || NEAT || — || align=right | 2.2 km || 
|-id=126 bgcolor=#fefefe
| 73126 ||  || — || April 8, 2002 || Palomar || NEAT || — || align=right | 1.3 km || 
|-id=127 bgcolor=#E9E9E9
| 73127 ||  || — || April 8, 2002 || Socorro || LINEAR || — || align=right | 3.7 km || 
|-id=128 bgcolor=#E9E9E9
| 73128 ||  || — || April 8, 2002 || Socorro || LINEAR || — || align=right | 3.1 km || 
|-id=129 bgcolor=#E9E9E9
| 73129 ||  || — || April 9, 2002 || Anderson Mesa || LONEOS || — || align=right | 4.5 km || 
|-id=130 bgcolor=#fefefe
| 73130 ||  || — || April 9, 2002 || Anderson Mesa || LONEOS || — || align=right | 1.7 km || 
|-id=131 bgcolor=#fefefe
| 73131 ||  || — || April 9, 2002 || Socorro || LINEAR || — || align=right | 2.1 km || 
|-id=132 bgcolor=#fefefe
| 73132 ||  || — || April 9, 2002 || Socorro || LINEAR || V || align=right | 1.4 km || 
|-id=133 bgcolor=#fefefe
| 73133 ||  || — || April 9, 2002 || Socorro || LINEAR || — || align=right | 1.6 km || 
|-id=134 bgcolor=#fefefe
| 73134 ||  || — || April 9, 2002 || Socorro || LINEAR || V || align=right | 1.4 km || 
|-id=135 bgcolor=#fefefe
| 73135 ||  || — || April 9, 2002 || Socorro || LINEAR || NYS || align=right | 1.6 km || 
|-id=136 bgcolor=#fefefe
| 73136 ||  || — || April 9, 2002 || Socorro || LINEAR || V || align=right | 1.5 km || 
|-id=137 bgcolor=#E9E9E9
| 73137 ||  || — || April 9, 2002 || Kitt Peak || Spacewatch || EUN || align=right | 2.5 km || 
|-id=138 bgcolor=#E9E9E9
| 73138 ||  || — || April 9, 2002 || Socorro || LINEAR || — || align=right | 2.7 km || 
|-id=139 bgcolor=#E9E9E9
| 73139 ||  || — || April 10, 2002 || Socorro || LINEAR || — || align=right | 2.1 km || 
|-id=140 bgcolor=#fefefe
| 73140 ||  || — || April 10, 2002 || Socorro || LINEAR || — || align=right | 1.6 km || 
|-id=141 bgcolor=#E9E9E9
| 73141 ||  || — || April 10, 2002 || Socorro || LINEAR || — || align=right | 2.2 km || 
|-id=142 bgcolor=#fefefe
| 73142 ||  || — || April 10, 2002 || Socorro || LINEAR || V || align=right | 1.8 km || 
|-id=143 bgcolor=#E9E9E9
| 73143 ||  || — || April 10, 2002 || Socorro || LINEAR || MAR || align=right | 2.4 km || 
|-id=144 bgcolor=#E9E9E9
| 73144 ||  || — || April 9, 2002 || Socorro || LINEAR || — || align=right | 2.4 km || 
|-id=145 bgcolor=#E9E9E9
| 73145 ||  || — || April 9, 2002 || Socorro || LINEAR || DOR || align=right | 5.1 km || 
|-id=146 bgcolor=#fefefe
| 73146 ||  || — || April 10, 2002 || Socorro || LINEAR || — || align=right | 1.5 km || 
|-id=147 bgcolor=#E9E9E9
| 73147 ||  || — || April 10, 2002 || Socorro || LINEAR || — || align=right | 2.6 km || 
|-id=148 bgcolor=#fefefe
| 73148 ||  || — || April 10, 2002 || Socorro || LINEAR || — || align=right | 1.8 km || 
|-id=149 bgcolor=#fefefe
| 73149 ||  || — || April 10, 2002 || Socorro || LINEAR || FLO || align=right | 1.7 km || 
|-id=150 bgcolor=#E9E9E9
| 73150 ||  || — || April 10, 2002 || Socorro || LINEAR || — || align=right | 2.0 km || 
|-id=151 bgcolor=#E9E9E9
| 73151 ||  || — || April 10, 2002 || Socorro || LINEAR || — || align=right | 4.7 km || 
|-id=152 bgcolor=#E9E9E9
| 73152 ||  || — || April 10, 2002 || Socorro || LINEAR || EUN || align=right | 2.1 km || 
|-id=153 bgcolor=#fefefe
| 73153 ||  || — || April 11, 2002 || Anderson Mesa || LONEOS || V || align=right | 1.6 km || 
|-id=154 bgcolor=#fefefe
| 73154 ||  || — || April 10, 2002 || Socorro || LINEAR || NYS || align=right | 1.6 km || 
|-id=155 bgcolor=#fefefe
| 73155 ||  || — || April 10, 2002 || Socorro || LINEAR || — || align=right | 2.4 km || 
|-id=156 bgcolor=#E9E9E9
| 73156 ||  || — || April 10, 2002 || Socorro || LINEAR || — || align=right | 2.7 km || 
|-id=157 bgcolor=#E9E9E9
| 73157 ||  || — || April 12, 2002 || Palomar || NEAT || — || align=right | 2.0 km || 
|-id=158 bgcolor=#E9E9E9
| 73158 ||  || — || April 12, 2002 || Haleakala || NEAT || EUN || align=right | 2.3 km || 
|-id=159 bgcolor=#E9E9E9
| 73159 ||  || — || April 13, 2002 || Kitt Peak || Spacewatch || — || align=right | 2.0 km || 
|-id=160 bgcolor=#fefefe
| 73160 ||  || — || April 13, 2002 || Palomar || NEAT || — || align=right | 1.3 km || 
|-id=161 bgcolor=#fefefe
| 73161 ||  || — || April 12, 2002 || Haleakala || NEAT || — || align=right | 1.7 km || 
|-id=162 bgcolor=#fefefe
| 73162 ||  || — || April 14, 2002 || Socorro || LINEAR || FLO || align=right | 1.6 km || 
|-id=163 bgcolor=#E9E9E9
| 73163 ||  || — || April 12, 2002 || Palomar || NEAT || ADE || align=right | 6.2 km || 
|-id=164 bgcolor=#fefefe
| 73164 ||  || — || April 13, 2002 || Palomar || NEAT || V || align=right | 1.6 km || 
|-id=165 bgcolor=#E9E9E9
| 73165 ||  || — || April 15, 2002 || Anderson Mesa || LONEOS || — || align=right | 4.1 km || 
|-id=166 bgcolor=#E9E9E9
| 73166 ||  || — || April 15, 2002 || Kitt Peak || Spacewatch || MAR || align=right | 2.3 km || 
|-id=167 bgcolor=#fefefe
| 73167 ||  || — || April 9, 2002 || Socorro || LINEAR || — || align=right | 1.6 km || 
|-id=168 bgcolor=#E9E9E9
| 73168 ||  || — || April 9, 2002 || Socorro || LINEAR || — || align=right | 4.1 km || 
|-id=169 bgcolor=#E9E9E9
| 73169 ||  || — || April 10, 2002 || Socorro || LINEAR || — || align=right | 4.5 km || 
|-id=170 bgcolor=#fefefe
| 73170 ||  || — || April 16, 2002 || Socorro || LINEAR || — || align=right | 2.4 km || 
|-id=171 bgcolor=#fefefe
| 73171 ||  || — || April 16, 2002 || Socorro || LINEAR || — || align=right | 2.0 km || 
|-id=172 bgcolor=#fefefe
| 73172 ||  || — || April 16, 2002 || Socorro || LINEAR || — || align=right | 1.6 km || 
|-id=173 bgcolor=#fefefe
| 73173 ||  || — || April 16, 2002 || Socorro || LINEAR || V || align=right | 1.6 km || 
|-id=174 bgcolor=#fefefe
| 73174 ||  || — || April 16, 2002 || Socorro || LINEAR || V || align=right | 1.6 km || 
|-id=175 bgcolor=#d6d6d6
| 73175 ||  || — || April 16, 2002 || Socorro || LINEAR || — || align=right | 4.7 km || 
|-id=176 bgcolor=#fefefe
| 73176 ||  || — || April 18, 2002 || Haleakala || NEAT || FLO || align=right | 1.6 km || 
|-id=177 bgcolor=#E9E9E9
| 73177 ||  || — || April 18, 2002 || Desert Eagle || W. K. Y. Yeung || — || align=right | 5.2 km || 
|-id=178 bgcolor=#fefefe
| 73178 ||  || — || April 17, 2002 || Socorro || LINEAR || MAS || align=right | 1.6 km || 
|-id=179 bgcolor=#E9E9E9
| 73179 ||  || — || April 21, 2002 || Socorro || LINEAR || — || align=right | 2.3 km || 
|-id=180 bgcolor=#E9E9E9
| 73180 ||  || — || April 18, 2002 || Haleakala || NEAT || ADE || align=right | 4.2 km || 
|-id=181 bgcolor=#fefefe
| 73181 ||  || — || April 29, 2002 || Palomar || NEAT || — || align=right | 1.8 km || 
|-id=182 bgcolor=#fefefe
| 73182 ||  || — || April 17, 2002 || Socorro || LINEAR || MAS || align=right | 1.4 km || 
|-id=183 bgcolor=#E9E9E9
| 73183 ||  || — || April 17, 2002 || Socorro || LINEAR || — || align=right | 4.0 km || 
|-id=184 bgcolor=#d6d6d6
| 73184 || 2002 JN || — || May 3, 2002 || Desert Eagle || W. K. Y. Yeung || — || align=right | 6.2 km || 
|-id=185 bgcolor=#fefefe
| 73185 || 2002 JP || — || May 3, 2002 || Desert Eagle || W. K. Y. Yeung || — || align=right | 1.8 km || 
|-id=186 bgcolor=#E9E9E9
| 73186 || 2002 JQ || — || May 3, 2002 || Desert Eagle || W. K. Y. Yeung || — || align=right | 5.2 km || 
|-id=187 bgcolor=#E9E9E9
| 73187 || 2002 JS || — || May 3, 2002 || Desert Eagle || W. K. Y. Yeung || — || align=right | 5.5 km || 
|-id=188 bgcolor=#fefefe
| 73188 || 2002 JU || — || May 3, 2002 || Desert Eagle || W. K. Y. Yeung || — || align=right | 1.9 km || 
|-id=189 bgcolor=#E9E9E9
| 73189 || 2002 JV || — || May 3, 2002 || Desert Eagle || W. K. Y. Yeung || — || align=right | 3.4 km || 
|-id=190 bgcolor=#fefefe
| 73190 ||  || — || May 3, 2002 || Kitt Peak || Spacewatch || — || align=right | 1.7 km || 
|-id=191 bgcolor=#E9E9E9
| 73191 ||  || — || May 4, 2002 || Desert Eagle || W. K. Y. Yeung || — || align=right | 3.4 km || 
|-id=192 bgcolor=#fefefe
| 73192 ||  || — || May 4, 2002 || Kitt Peak || Spacewatch || — || align=right | 2.1 km || 
|-id=193 bgcolor=#E9E9E9
| 73193 ||  || — || May 5, 2002 || Palomar || NEAT || — || align=right | 2.3 km || 
|-id=194 bgcolor=#fefefe
| 73194 ||  || — || May 6, 2002 || Palomar || NEAT || V || align=right | 1.9 km || 
|-id=195 bgcolor=#fefefe
| 73195 ||  || — || May 7, 2002 || Socorro || LINEAR || — || align=right | 1.8 km || 
|-id=196 bgcolor=#fefefe
| 73196 ||  || — || May 8, 2002 || Emerald Lane || L. Ball || — || align=right | 2.0 km || 
|-id=197 bgcolor=#E9E9E9
| 73197 ||  || — || May 5, 2002 || Desert Eagle || W. K. Y. Yeung || HNS || align=right | 3.4 km || 
|-id=198 bgcolor=#fefefe
| 73198 ||  || — || May 6, 2002 || Desert Eagle || W. K. Y. Yeung || V || align=right | 2.0 km || 
|-id=199 bgcolor=#E9E9E9
| 73199 Orlece ||  ||  || May 8, 2002 || Desert Eagle || W. K. Y. Yeung || — || align=right | 3.0 km || 
|-id=200 bgcolor=#d6d6d6
| 73200 ||  || — || May 6, 2002 || Kitt Peak || Spacewatch || — || align=right | 6.0 km || 
|}

73201–73300 

|-bgcolor=#d6d6d6
| 73201 ||  || — || May 7, 2002 || Socorro || LINEAR || EUP || align=right | 8.0 km || 
|-id=202 bgcolor=#fefefe
| 73202 ||  || — || May 8, 2002 || Socorro || LINEAR || V || align=right | 1.9 km || 
|-id=203 bgcolor=#fefefe
| 73203 ||  || — || May 8, 2002 || Socorro || LINEAR || — || align=right | 2.3 km || 
|-id=204 bgcolor=#fefefe
| 73204 ||  || — || May 8, 2002 || Desert Eagle || W. K. Y. Yeung || NYS || align=right | 1.4 km || 
|-id=205 bgcolor=#fefefe
| 73205 ||  || — || May 7, 2002 || Palomar || NEAT || SUL || align=right | 4.2 km || 
|-id=206 bgcolor=#E9E9E9
| 73206 ||  || — || May 7, 2002 || Palomar || NEAT || — || align=right | 3.2 km || 
|-id=207 bgcolor=#fefefe
| 73207 ||  || — || May 7, 2002 || Palomar || NEAT || FLO || align=right | 1.4 km || 
|-id=208 bgcolor=#fefefe
| 73208 ||  || — || May 7, 2002 || Palomar || NEAT || — || align=right | 1.7 km || 
|-id=209 bgcolor=#fefefe
| 73209 ||  || — || May 7, 2002 || Palomar || NEAT || FLO || align=right | 1.6 km || 
|-id=210 bgcolor=#fefefe
| 73210 ||  || — || May 8, 2002 || Palomar || NEAT || FLO || align=right | 1.4 km || 
|-id=211 bgcolor=#E9E9E9
| 73211 ||  || — || May 8, 2002 || Haleakala || NEAT || — || align=right | 4.1 km || 
|-id=212 bgcolor=#fefefe
| 73212 ||  || — || May 7, 2002 || Socorro || LINEAR || — || align=right | 1.6 km || 
|-id=213 bgcolor=#fefefe
| 73213 ||  || — || May 8, 2002 || Socorro || LINEAR || V || align=right | 1.8 km || 
|-id=214 bgcolor=#fefefe
| 73214 ||  || — || May 8, 2002 || Socorro || LINEAR || MAS || align=right | 1.4 km || 
|-id=215 bgcolor=#fefefe
| 73215 ||  || — || May 8, 2002 || Socorro || LINEAR || FLO || align=right | 1.6 km || 
|-id=216 bgcolor=#E9E9E9
| 73216 ||  || — || May 8, 2002 || Socorro || LINEAR || XIZ || align=right | 3.3 km || 
|-id=217 bgcolor=#fefefe
| 73217 ||  || — || May 8, 2002 || Socorro || LINEAR || — || align=right | 1.6 km || 
|-id=218 bgcolor=#fefefe
| 73218 ||  || — || May 8, 2002 || Socorro || LINEAR || — || align=right | 2.0 km || 
|-id=219 bgcolor=#E9E9E9
| 73219 ||  || — || May 8, 2002 || Socorro || LINEAR || — || align=right | 1.9 km || 
|-id=220 bgcolor=#E9E9E9
| 73220 ||  || — || May 8, 2002 || Socorro || LINEAR || — || align=right | 4.6 km || 
|-id=221 bgcolor=#fefefe
| 73221 ||  || — || May 8, 2002 || Socorro || LINEAR || — || align=right | 1.7 km || 
|-id=222 bgcolor=#E9E9E9
| 73222 ||  || — || May 8, 2002 || Socorro || LINEAR || EUN || align=right | 2.7 km || 
|-id=223 bgcolor=#E9E9E9
| 73223 ||  || — || May 8, 2002 || Socorro || LINEAR || — || align=right | 3.2 km || 
|-id=224 bgcolor=#E9E9E9
| 73224 ||  || — || May 8, 2002 || Socorro || LINEAR || — || align=right | 5.0 km || 
|-id=225 bgcolor=#E9E9E9
| 73225 ||  || — || May 8, 2002 || Socorro || LINEAR || — || align=right | 4.8 km || 
|-id=226 bgcolor=#fefefe
| 73226 ||  || — || May 8, 2002 || Socorro || LINEAR || — || align=right | 1.9 km || 
|-id=227 bgcolor=#E9E9E9
| 73227 ||  || — || May 8, 2002 || Socorro || LINEAR || — || align=right | 2.2 km || 
|-id=228 bgcolor=#fefefe
| 73228 ||  || — || May 8, 2002 || Socorro || LINEAR || FLO || align=right | 1.6 km || 
|-id=229 bgcolor=#fefefe
| 73229 ||  || — || May 9, 2002 || Socorro || LINEAR || — || align=right | 1.7 km || 
|-id=230 bgcolor=#E9E9E9
| 73230 ||  || — || May 9, 2002 || Socorro || LINEAR || — || align=right | 2.1 km || 
|-id=231 bgcolor=#fefefe
| 73231 ||  || — || May 9, 2002 || Socorro || LINEAR || — || align=right | 1.9 km || 
|-id=232 bgcolor=#fefefe
| 73232 ||  || — || May 9, 2002 || Socorro || LINEAR || — || align=right | 1.9 km || 
|-id=233 bgcolor=#d6d6d6
| 73233 ||  || — || May 9, 2002 || Socorro || LINEAR || — || align=right | 5.7 km || 
|-id=234 bgcolor=#d6d6d6
| 73234 ||  || — || May 9, 2002 || Socorro || LINEAR || HYG || align=right | 5.4 km || 
|-id=235 bgcolor=#fefefe
| 73235 ||  || — || May 9, 2002 || Socorro || LINEAR || — || align=right | 1.3 km || 
|-id=236 bgcolor=#fefefe
| 73236 ||  || — || May 9, 2002 || Socorro || LINEAR || — || align=right | 1.6 km || 
|-id=237 bgcolor=#fefefe
| 73237 ||  || — || May 9, 2002 || Socorro || LINEAR || — || align=right | 2.4 km || 
|-id=238 bgcolor=#fefefe
| 73238 ||  || — || May 9, 2002 || Socorro || LINEAR || — || align=right | 2.2 km || 
|-id=239 bgcolor=#fefefe
| 73239 ||  || — || May 9, 2002 || Socorro || LINEAR || FLO || align=right | 1.4 km || 
|-id=240 bgcolor=#fefefe
| 73240 ||  || — || May 9, 2002 || Socorro || LINEAR || V || align=right | 1.2 km || 
|-id=241 bgcolor=#E9E9E9
| 73241 ||  || — || May 9, 2002 || Socorro || LINEAR || — || align=right | 3.0 km || 
|-id=242 bgcolor=#fefefe
| 73242 ||  || — || May 9, 2002 || Socorro || LINEAR || — || align=right | 2.1 km || 
|-id=243 bgcolor=#E9E9E9
| 73243 ||  || — || May 9, 2002 || Socorro || LINEAR || MRX || align=right | 3.5 km || 
|-id=244 bgcolor=#E9E9E9
| 73244 ||  || — || May 9, 2002 || Palomar || NEAT || AGN || align=right | 2.6 km || 
|-id=245 bgcolor=#fefefe
| 73245 ||  || — || May 10, 2002 || Desert Eagle || W. K. Y. Yeung || — || align=right | 2.2 km || 
|-id=246 bgcolor=#d6d6d6
| 73246 ||  || — || May 8, 2002 || Socorro || LINEAR || — || align=right | 5.6 km || 
|-id=247 bgcolor=#fefefe
| 73247 ||  || — || May 8, 2002 || Socorro || LINEAR || V || align=right | 1.3 km || 
|-id=248 bgcolor=#fefefe
| 73248 ||  || — || May 8, 2002 || Socorro || LINEAR || V || align=right | 1.5 km || 
|-id=249 bgcolor=#fefefe
| 73249 ||  || — || May 8, 2002 || Socorro || LINEAR || NYS || align=right | 1.6 km || 
|-id=250 bgcolor=#fefefe
| 73250 ||  || — || May 8, 2002 || Socorro || LINEAR || FLO || align=right | 1.7 km || 
|-id=251 bgcolor=#fefefe
| 73251 ||  || — || May 8, 2002 || Socorro || LINEAR || FLO || align=right | 1.7 km || 
|-id=252 bgcolor=#fefefe
| 73252 ||  || — || May 8, 2002 || Socorro || LINEAR || — || align=right | 1.6 km || 
|-id=253 bgcolor=#d6d6d6
| 73253 ||  || — || May 9, 2002 || Socorro || LINEAR || — || align=right | 5.5 km || 
|-id=254 bgcolor=#fefefe
| 73254 ||  || — || May 9, 2002 || Socorro || LINEAR || — || align=right | 1.9 km || 
|-id=255 bgcolor=#fefefe
| 73255 ||  || — || May 9, 2002 || Socorro || LINEAR || — || align=right | 1.8 km || 
|-id=256 bgcolor=#E9E9E9
| 73256 ||  || — || May 9, 2002 || Socorro || LINEAR || MIT || align=right | 2.2 km || 
|-id=257 bgcolor=#fefefe
| 73257 ||  || — || May 9, 2002 || Socorro || LINEAR || — || align=right | 1.7 km || 
|-id=258 bgcolor=#fefefe
| 73258 ||  || — || May 9, 2002 || Socorro || LINEAR || — || align=right | 2.1 km || 
|-id=259 bgcolor=#E9E9E9
| 73259 ||  || — || May 9, 2002 || Socorro || LINEAR || EUN || align=right | 3.0 km || 
|-id=260 bgcolor=#E9E9E9
| 73260 ||  || — || May 9, 2002 || Socorro || LINEAR || — || align=right | 2.5 km || 
|-id=261 bgcolor=#fefefe
| 73261 ||  || — || May 9, 2002 || Socorro || LINEAR || — || align=right | 1.4 km || 
|-id=262 bgcolor=#d6d6d6
| 73262 ||  || — || May 9, 2002 || Socorro || LINEAR || — || align=right | 5.3 km || 
|-id=263 bgcolor=#fefefe
| 73263 ||  || — || May 9, 2002 || Socorro || LINEAR || NYS || align=right | 2.8 km || 
|-id=264 bgcolor=#E9E9E9
| 73264 ||  || — || May 9, 2002 || Socorro || LINEAR || GEF || align=right | 2.6 km || 
|-id=265 bgcolor=#fefefe
| 73265 ||  || — || May 9, 2002 || Socorro || LINEAR || V || align=right | 1.6 km || 
|-id=266 bgcolor=#fefefe
| 73266 ||  || — || May 9, 2002 || Socorro || LINEAR || — || align=right | 1.6 km || 
|-id=267 bgcolor=#fefefe
| 73267 ||  || — || May 9, 2002 || Socorro || LINEAR || — || align=right | 1.4 km || 
|-id=268 bgcolor=#fefefe
| 73268 ||  || — || May 9, 2002 || Socorro || LINEAR || — || align=right | 2.1 km || 
|-id=269 bgcolor=#E9E9E9
| 73269 ||  || — || May 9, 2002 || Socorro || LINEAR || VIB || align=right | 4.9 km || 
|-id=270 bgcolor=#E9E9E9
| 73270 ||  || — || May 9, 2002 || Socorro || LINEAR || — || align=right | 3.2 km || 
|-id=271 bgcolor=#fefefe
| 73271 ||  || — || May 9, 2002 || Socorro || LINEAR || — || align=right | 2.0 km || 
|-id=272 bgcolor=#E9E9E9
| 73272 ||  || — || May 9, 2002 || Socorro || LINEAR || — || align=right | 2.9 km || 
|-id=273 bgcolor=#E9E9E9
| 73273 ||  || — || May 9, 2002 || Socorro || LINEAR || — || align=right | 2.6 km || 
|-id=274 bgcolor=#E9E9E9
| 73274 ||  || — || May 9, 2002 || Socorro || LINEAR || — || align=right | 2.7 km || 
|-id=275 bgcolor=#E9E9E9
| 73275 ||  || — || May 9, 2002 || Socorro || LINEAR || — || align=right | 2.9 km || 
|-id=276 bgcolor=#fefefe
| 73276 ||  || — || May 9, 2002 || Socorro || LINEAR || fast? || align=right | 1.7 km || 
|-id=277 bgcolor=#d6d6d6
| 73277 ||  || — || May 9, 2002 || Socorro || LINEAR || — || align=right | 7.2 km || 
|-id=278 bgcolor=#d6d6d6
| 73278 ||  || — || May 9, 2002 || Socorro || LINEAR || EOS || align=right | 4.8 km || 
|-id=279 bgcolor=#fefefe
| 73279 ||  || — || May 9, 2002 || Socorro || LINEAR || FLO || align=right | 1.7 km || 
|-id=280 bgcolor=#d6d6d6
| 73280 ||  || — || May 9, 2002 || Socorro || LINEAR || KOR || align=right | 3.4 km || 
|-id=281 bgcolor=#d6d6d6
| 73281 ||  || — || May 9, 2002 || Socorro || LINEAR || HYG || align=right | 6.5 km || 
|-id=282 bgcolor=#fefefe
| 73282 ||  || — || May 8, 2002 || Socorro || LINEAR || V || align=right | 1.3 km || 
|-id=283 bgcolor=#E9E9E9
| 73283 ||  || — || May 8, 2002 || Socorro || LINEAR || ADE || align=right | 4.8 km || 
|-id=284 bgcolor=#fefefe
| 73284 ||  || — || May 9, 2002 || Socorro || LINEAR || — || align=right | 1.9 km || 
|-id=285 bgcolor=#fefefe
| 73285 ||  || — || May 9, 2002 || Socorro || LINEAR || — || align=right | 2.3 km || 
|-id=286 bgcolor=#d6d6d6
| 73286 ||  || — || May 9, 2002 || Socorro || LINEAR || — || align=right | 7.0 km || 
|-id=287 bgcolor=#fefefe
| 73287 ||  || — || May 9, 2002 || Socorro || LINEAR || FLO || align=right | 1.9 km || 
|-id=288 bgcolor=#fefefe
| 73288 ||  || — || May 9, 2002 || Socorro || LINEAR || MAS || align=right | 1.6 km || 
|-id=289 bgcolor=#d6d6d6
| 73289 ||  || — || May 9, 2002 || Socorro || LINEAR || — || align=right | 9.1 km || 
|-id=290 bgcolor=#d6d6d6
| 73290 ||  || — || May 9, 2002 || Socorro || LINEAR || — || align=right | 6.2 km || 
|-id=291 bgcolor=#fefefe
| 73291 ||  || — || May 9, 2002 || Socorro || LINEAR || V || align=right | 2.2 km || 
|-id=292 bgcolor=#E9E9E9
| 73292 ||  || — || May 9, 2002 || Socorro || LINEAR || ADE || align=right | 6.0 km || 
|-id=293 bgcolor=#E9E9E9
| 73293 ||  || — || May 9, 2002 || Socorro || LINEAR || — || align=right | 2.1 km || 
|-id=294 bgcolor=#E9E9E9
| 73294 ||  || — || May 10, 2002 || Socorro || LINEAR || — || align=right | 3.6 km || 
|-id=295 bgcolor=#d6d6d6
| 73295 ||  || — || May 8, 2002 || Bergisch Gladbach || W. Bickel || — || align=right | 11 km || 
|-id=296 bgcolor=#d6d6d6
| 73296 ||  || — || May 12, 2002 || Reedy Creek || J. Broughton || TIR || align=right | 5.5 km || 
|-id=297 bgcolor=#fefefe
| 73297 ||  || — || May 6, 2002 || Socorro || LINEAR || — || align=right | 4.1 km || 
|-id=298 bgcolor=#fefefe
| 73298 ||  || — || May 7, 2002 || Socorro || LINEAR || V || align=right | 1.5 km || 
|-id=299 bgcolor=#fefefe
| 73299 ||  || — || May 7, 2002 || Socorro || LINEAR || V || align=right | 1.8 km || 
|-id=300 bgcolor=#fefefe
| 73300 ||  || — || May 7, 2002 || Socorro || LINEAR || — || align=right | 1.9 km || 
|}

73301–73400 

|-bgcolor=#E9E9E9
| 73301 ||  || — || May 7, 2002 || Socorro || LINEAR || — || align=right | 5.8 km || 
|-id=302 bgcolor=#d6d6d6
| 73302 ||  || — || May 7, 2002 || Socorro || LINEAR || — || align=right | 6.1 km || 
|-id=303 bgcolor=#E9E9E9
| 73303 ||  || — || May 8, 2002 || Socorro || LINEAR || GEF || align=right | 2.4 km || 
|-id=304 bgcolor=#fefefe
| 73304 ||  || — || May 8, 2002 || Socorro || LINEAR || V || align=right | 1.3 km || 
|-id=305 bgcolor=#E9E9E9
| 73305 ||  || — || May 8, 2002 || Socorro || LINEAR || MAR || align=right | 2.5 km || 
|-id=306 bgcolor=#d6d6d6
| 73306 ||  || — || May 8, 2002 || Socorro || LINEAR || — || align=right | 7.2 km || 
|-id=307 bgcolor=#E9E9E9
| 73307 ||  || — || May 8, 2002 || Socorro || LINEAR || EUN || align=right | 2.9 km || 
|-id=308 bgcolor=#E9E9E9
| 73308 ||  || — || May 8, 2002 || Socorro || LINEAR || — || align=right | 2.4 km || 
|-id=309 bgcolor=#fefefe
| 73309 ||  || — || May 9, 2002 || Socorro || LINEAR || V || align=right | 1.5 km || 
|-id=310 bgcolor=#fefefe
| 73310 ||  || — || May 11, 2002 || Socorro || LINEAR || — || align=right | 1.6 km || 
|-id=311 bgcolor=#fefefe
| 73311 ||  || — || May 11, 2002 || Socorro || LINEAR || — || align=right | 1.5 km || 
|-id=312 bgcolor=#fefefe
| 73312 ||  || — || May 11, 2002 || Socorro || LINEAR || NYS || align=right | 3.3 km || 
|-id=313 bgcolor=#E9E9E9
| 73313 ||  || — || May 11, 2002 || Socorro || LINEAR || — || align=right | 2.3 km || 
|-id=314 bgcolor=#fefefe
| 73314 ||  || — || May 11, 2002 || Socorro || LINEAR || — || align=right | 1.6 km || 
|-id=315 bgcolor=#fefefe
| 73315 ||  || — || May 11, 2002 || Socorro || LINEAR || NYS || align=right | 3.3 km || 
|-id=316 bgcolor=#fefefe
| 73316 ||  || — || May 11, 2002 || Socorro || LINEAR || — || align=right | 1.6 km || 
|-id=317 bgcolor=#E9E9E9
| 73317 ||  || — || May 11, 2002 || Socorro || LINEAR || — || align=right | 1.7 km || 
|-id=318 bgcolor=#d6d6d6
| 73318 ||  || — || May 11, 2002 || Socorro || LINEAR || — || align=right | 4.9 km || 
|-id=319 bgcolor=#fefefe
| 73319 ||  || — || May 11, 2002 || Socorro || LINEAR || — || align=right | 1.7 km || 
|-id=320 bgcolor=#E9E9E9
| 73320 ||  || — || May 11, 2002 || Socorro || LINEAR || — || align=right | 2.3 km || 
|-id=321 bgcolor=#E9E9E9
| 73321 ||  || — || May 8, 2002 || Socorro || LINEAR || — || align=right | 5.0 km || 
|-id=322 bgcolor=#d6d6d6
| 73322 ||  || — || May 8, 2002 || Socorro || LINEAR || — || align=right | 5.1 km || 
|-id=323 bgcolor=#fefefe
| 73323 ||  || — || May 13, 2002 || Socorro || LINEAR || — || align=right | 1.8 km || 
|-id=324 bgcolor=#E9E9E9
| 73324 ||  || — || May 8, 2002 || Socorro || LINEAR || — || align=right | 2.2 km || 
|-id=325 bgcolor=#E9E9E9
| 73325 ||  || — || May 9, 2002 || Socorro || LINEAR || GER || align=right | 2.5 km || 
|-id=326 bgcolor=#fefefe
| 73326 ||  || — || May 9, 2002 || Socorro || LINEAR || — || align=right | 1.9 km || 
|-id=327 bgcolor=#E9E9E9
| 73327 ||  || — || May 10, 2002 || Socorro || LINEAR || — || align=right | 1.8 km || 
|-id=328 bgcolor=#d6d6d6
| 73328 ||  || — || May 12, 2002 || Socorro || LINEAR || THM || align=right | 6.9 km || 
|-id=329 bgcolor=#fefefe
| 73329 ||  || — || May 12, 2002 || Socorro || LINEAR || FLO || align=right | 1.3 km || 
|-id=330 bgcolor=#d6d6d6
| 73330 ||  || — || May 12, 2002 || Socorro || LINEAR || THM || align=right | 5.6 km || 
|-id=331 bgcolor=#E9E9E9
| 73331 ||  || — || May 15, 2002 || Socorro || LINEAR || — || align=right | 5.3 km || 
|-id=332 bgcolor=#E9E9E9
| 73332 ||  || — || May 10, 2002 || Palomar || NEAT || — || align=right | 2.1 km || 
|-id=333 bgcolor=#E9E9E9
| 73333 ||  || — || May 11, 2002 || Socorro || LINEAR || — || align=right | 2.7 km || 
|-id=334 bgcolor=#E9E9E9
| 73334 ||  || — || May 11, 2002 || Socorro || LINEAR || — || align=right | 3.2 km || 
|-id=335 bgcolor=#E9E9E9
| 73335 ||  || — || May 11, 2002 || Socorro || LINEAR || — || align=right | 3.1 km || 
|-id=336 bgcolor=#d6d6d6
| 73336 ||  || — || May 11, 2002 || Socorro || LINEAR || THB || align=right | 6.3 km || 
|-id=337 bgcolor=#fefefe
| 73337 ||  || — || May 11, 2002 || Socorro || LINEAR || — || align=right | 1.8 km || 
|-id=338 bgcolor=#fefefe
| 73338 ||  || — || May 11, 2002 || Socorro || LINEAR || — || align=right | 1.9 km || 
|-id=339 bgcolor=#fefefe
| 73339 ||  || — || May 13, 2002 || Socorro || LINEAR || — || align=right | 1.7 km || 
|-id=340 bgcolor=#E9E9E9
| 73340 ||  || — || May 13, 2002 || Socorro || LINEAR || MAR || align=right | 2.3 km || 
|-id=341 bgcolor=#E9E9E9
| 73341 ||  || — || May 13, 2002 || Socorro || LINEAR || — || align=right | 5.0 km || 
|-id=342 bgcolor=#E9E9E9
| 73342 Guyunusa ||  ||  || May 4, 2002 || Los Molinos || Los Molinos Obs. || — || align=right | 3.9 km || 
|-id=343 bgcolor=#E9E9E9
| 73343 ||  || — || May 4, 2002 || Anderson Mesa || LONEOS || INO || align=right | 2.9 km || 
|-id=344 bgcolor=#E9E9E9
| 73344 ||  || — || May 5, 2002 || Palomar || NEAT || — || align=right | 2.5 km || 
|-id=345 bgcolor=#E9E9E9
| 73345 ||  || — || May 5, 2002 || Palomar || NEAT || — || align=right | 3.2 km || 
|-id=346 bgcolor=#E9E9E9
| 73346 ||  || — || May 6, 2002 || Palomar || NEAT || DOR || align=right | 4.6 km || 
|-id=347 bgcolor=#fefefe
| 73347 ||  || — || May 6, 2002 || Kitt Peak || Spacewatch || V || align=right | 1.7 km || 
|-id=348 bgcolor=#E9E9E9
| 73348 ||  || — || May 8, 2002 || Socorro || LINEAR || — || align=right | 4.6 km || 
|-id=349 bgcolor=#fefefe
| 73349 ||  || — || May 8, 2002 || Haleakala || NEAT || — || align=right | 1.5 km || 
|-id=350 bgcolor=#fefefe
| 73350 ||  || — || May 9, 2002 || Palomar || NEAT || — || align=right | 1.5 km || 
|-id=351 bgcolor=#fefefe
| 73351 ||  || — || May 9, 2002 || Socorro || LINEAR || — || align=right | 1.9 km || 
|-id=352 bgcolor=#fefefe
| 73352 ||  || — || May 9, 2002 || Palomar || NEAT || — || align=right | 1.8 km || 
|-id=353 bgcolor=#d6d6d6
| 73353 ||  || — || May 9, 2002 || Palomar || NEAT || KOR || align=right | 2.7 km || 
|-id=354 bgcolor=#E9E9E9
| 73354 ||  || — || May 11, 2002 || Socorro || LINEAR || — || align=right | 4.5 km || 
|-id=355 bgcolor=#E9E9E9
| 73355 ||  || — || May 13, 2002 || Palomar || NEAT || MAR || align=right | 2.2 km || 
|-id=356 bgcolor=#E9E9E9
| 73356 ||  || — || May 15, 2002 || Haleakala || NEAT || — || align=right | 2.5 km || 
|-id=357 bgcolor=#fefefe
| 73357 || 2002 KB || — || May 16, 2002 || Fountain Hills || Fountain Hills Obs. || H || align=right | 2.3 km || 
|-id=358 bgcolor=#E9E9E9
| 73358 Kitwhitten ||  ||  || May 17, 2002 || Palomar || NEAT || HOF || align=right | 5.7 km || 
|-id=359 bgcolor=#fefefe
| 73359 ||  || — || May 17, 2002 || Palomar || NEAT || V || align=right | 1.3 km || 
|-id=360 bgcolor=#fefefe
| 73360 ||  || — || May 18, 2002 || Palomar || NEAT || — || align=right | 1.2 km || 
|-id=361 bgcolor=#d6d6d6
| 73361 ||  || — || May 16, 2002 || Socorro || LINEAR || HYG || align=right | 5.5 km || 
|-id=362 bgcolor=#d6d6d6
| 73362 ||  || — || May 16, 2002 || Socorro || LINEAR || — || align=right | 4.2 km || 
|-id=363 bgcolor=#d6d6d6
| 73363 ||  || — || May 27, 2002 || Haleakala || NEAT || — || align=right | 17 km || 
|-id=364 bgcolor=#d6d6d6
| 73364 ||  || — || May 27, 2002 || Palomar || NEAT || TIR || align=right | 7.4 km || 
|-id=365 bgcolor=#d6d6d6
| 73365 ||  || — || May 29, 2002 || Haleakala || NEAT || — || align=right | 11 km || 
|-id=366 bgcolor=#E9E9E9
| 73366 ||  || — || May 29, 2002 || Haleakala || NEAT || — || align=right | 5.4 km || 
|-id=367 bgcolor=#d6d6d6
| 73367 ||  || — || May 29, 2002 || Haleakala || NEAT || — || align=right | 4.8 km || 
|-id=368 bgcolor=#d6d6d6
| 73368 ||  || — || May 16, 2002 || Haleakala || NEAT || — || align=right | 4.1 km || 
|-id=369 bgcolor=#E9E9E9
| 73369 ||  || — || May 17, 2002 || Palomar || NEAT || — || align=right | 4.2 km || 
|-id=370 bgcolor=#E9E9E9
| 73370 ||  || — || May 17, 2002 || Kitt Peak || Spacewatch || — || align=right | 5.7 km || 
|-id=371 bgcolor=#d6d6d6
| 73371 ||  || — || May 18, 2002 || Palomar || NEAT || KOR || align=right | 2.7 km || 
|-id=372 bgcolor=#fefefe
| 73372 ||  || — || May 18, 2002 || Socorro || LINEAR || V || align=right | 1.4 km || 
|-id=373 bgcolor=#d6d6d6
| 73373 ||  || — || May 19, 2002 || Palomar || NEAT || — || align=right | 5.2 km || 
|-id=374 bgcolor=#E9E9E9
| 73374 ||  || — || May 30, 2002 || Palomar || NEAT || — || align=right | 3.5 km || 
|-id=375 bgcolor=#d6d6d6
| 73375 ||  || — || June 4, 2002 || Anderson Mesa || LONEOS || — || align=right | 5.7 km || 
|-id=376 bgcolor=#E9E9E9
| 73376 ||  || — || June 4, 2002 || Anderson Mesa || LONEOS || RAF || align=right | 2.5 km || 
|-id=377 bgcolor=#fefefe
| 73377 ||  || — || June 5, 2002 || Socorro || LINEAR || FLO || align=right | 1.3 km || 
|-id=378 bgcolor=#E9E9E9
| 73378 ||  || — || June 7, 2002 || Haleakala || NEAT || EUN || align=right | 2.8 km || 
|-id=379 bgcolor=#E9E9E9
| 73379 ||  || — || June 2, 2002 || Palomar || NEAT || — || align=right | 2.9 km || 
|-id=380 bgcolor=#fefefe
| 73380 ||  || — || June 2, 2002 || Anderson Mesa || LONEOS || — || align=right | 1.8 km || 
|-id=381 bgcolor=#fefefe
| 73381 ||  || — || June 4, 2002 || Socorro || LINEAR || V || align=right | 1.3 km || 
|-id=382 bgcolor=#E9E9E9
| 73382 ||  || — || June 5, 2002 || Socorro || LINEAR || — || align=right | 4.9 km || 
|-id=383 bgcolor=#fefefe
| 73383 ||  || — || June 5, 2002 || Socorro || LINEAR || — || align=right | 2.0 km || 
|-id=384 bgcolor=#fefefe
| 73384 ||  || — || June 5, 2002 || Socorro || LINEAR || FLO || align=right | 2.4 km || 
|-id=385 bgcolor=#fefefe
| 73385 ||  || — || June 5, 2002 || Socorro || LINEAR || NYS || align=right | 1.3 km || 
|-id=386 bgcolor=#E9E9E9
| 73386 ||  || — || June 5, 2002 || Socorro || LINEAR || — || align=right | 5.1 km || 
|-id=387 bgcolor=#E9E9E9
| 73387 ||  || — || June 5, 2002 || Socorro || LINEAR || — || align=right | 5.4 km || 
|-id=388 bgcolor=#E9E9E9
| 73388 ||  || — || June 5, 2002 || Socorro || LINEAR || — || align=right | 2.0 km || 
|-id=389 bgcolor=#d6d6d6
| 73389 ||  || — || June 5, 2002 || Socorro || LINEAR || — || align=right | 6.7 km || 
|-id=390 bgcolor=#E9E9E9
| 73390 ||  || — || June 6, 2002 || Socorro || LINEAR || — || align=right | 6.3 km || 
|-id=391 bgcolor=#E9E9E9
| 73391 ||  || — || June 6, 2002 || Socorro || LINEAR || — || align=right | 2.6 km || 
|-id=392 bgcolor=#E9E9E9
| 73392 ||  || — || June 6, 2002 || Socorro || LINEAR || NEM || align=right | 4.7 km || 
|-id=393 bgcolor=#fefefe
| 73393 ||  || — || June 6, 2002 || Socorro || LINEAR || — || align=right | 4.1 km || 
|-id=394 bgcolor=#E9E9E9
| 73394 ||  || — || June 6, 2002 || Socorro || LINEAR || INO || align=right | 3.0 km || 
|-id=395 bgcolor=#d6d6d6
| 73395 ||  || — || June 6, 2002 || Socorro || LINEAR || — || align=right | 6.6 km || 
|-id=396 bgcolor=#d6d6d6
| 73396 ||  || — || June 6, 2002 || Socorro || LINEAR || — || align=right | 5.6 km || 
|-id=397 bgcolor=#d6d6d6
| 73397 ||  || — || June 6, 2002 || Socorro || LINEAR || — || align=right | 13 km || 
|-id=398 bgcolor=#fefefe
| 73398 ||  || — || June 6, 2002 || Socorro || LINEAR || — || align=right | 2.1 km || 
|-id=399 bgcolor=#E9E9E9
| 73399 ||  || — || June 6, 2002 || Socorro || LINEAR || GER || align=right | 5.3 km || 
|-id=400 bgcolor=#d6d6d6
| 73400 ||  || — || June 6, 2002 || Socorro || LINEAR || — || align=right | 4.8 km || 
|}

73401–73500 

|-bgcolor=#d6d6d6
| 73401 ||  || — || June 8, 2002 || Socorro || LINEAR || KOR || align=right | 3.3 km || 
|-id=402 bgcolor=#d6d6d6
| 73402 ||  || — || June 8, 2002 || Socorro || LINEAR || — || align=right | 6.6 km || 
|-id=403 bgcolor=#d6d6d6
| 73403 ||  || — || June 8, 2002 || Socorro || LINEAR || — || align=right | 6.1 km || 
|-id=404 bgcolor=#E9E9E9
| 73404 ||  || — || June 9, 2002 || Reedy Creek || J. Broughton || — || align=right | 2.0 km || 
|-id=405 bgcolor=#E9E9E9
| 73405 ||  || — || June 2, 2002 || Anderson Mesa || LONEOS || — || align=right | 2.4 km || 
|-id=406 bgcolor=#E9E9E9
| 73406 ||  || — || June 5, 2002 || Socorro || LINEAR || — || align=right | 4.2 km || 
|-id=407 bgcolor=#d6d6d6
| 73407 ||  || — || June 5, 2002 || Socorro || LINEAR || TIR || align=right | 6.9 km || 
|-id=408 bgcolor=#fefefe
| 73408 ||  || — || June 6, 2002 || Socorro || LINEAR || FLO || align=right | 1.7 km || 
|-id=409 bgcolor=#d6d6d6
| 73409 ||  || — || June 6, 2002 || Socorro || LINEAR || EOS || align=right | 4.8 km || 
|-id=410 bgcolor=#E9E9E9
| 73410 ||  || — || June 7, 2002 || Socorro || LINEAR || — || align=right | 5.5 km || 
|-id=411 bgcolor=#d6d6d6
| 73411 ||  || — || June 7, 2002 || Socorro || LINEAR || — || align=right | 7.9 km || 
|-id=412 bgcolor=#d6d6d6
| 73412 ||  || — || June 9, 2002 || Socorro || LINEAR || EOS || align=right | 4.4 km || 
|-id=413 bgcolor=#d6d6d6
| 73413 ||  || — || June 9, 2002 || Socorro || LINEAR || HYG || align=right | 6.7 km || 
|-id=414 bgcolor=#E9E9E9
| 73414 ||  || — || June 3, 2002 || Palomar || NEAT || — || align=right | 2.7 km || 
|-id=415 bgcolor=#E9E9E9
| 73415 ||  || — || June 3, 2002 || Socorro || LINEAR || — || align=right | 3.1 km || 
|-id=416 bgcolor=#E9E9E9
| 73416 ||  || — || June 8, 2002 || Socorro || LINEAR || — || align=right | 4.7 km || 
|-id=417 bgcolor=#E9E9E9
| 73417 ||  || — || June 9, 2002 || Socorro || LINEAR || — || align=right | 4.8 km || 
|-id=418 bgcolor=#d6d6d6
| 73418 ||  || — || June 9, 2002 || Socorro || LINEAR || 3:2 || align=right | 12 km || 
|-id=419 bgcolor=#d6d6d6
| 73419 ||  || — || June 9, 2002 || Socorro || LINEAR || — || align=right | 5.0 km || 
|-id=420 bgcolor=#E9E9E9
| 73420 ||  || — || June 9, 2002 || Socorro || LINEAR || — || align=right | 3.0 km || 
|-id=421 bgcolor=#E9E9E9
| 73421 ||  || — || June 7, 2002 || Socorro || LINEAR || — || align=right | 3.1 km || 
|-id=422 bgcolor=#d6d6d6
| 73422 ||  || — || June 7, 2002 || Socorro || LINEAR || — || align=right | 9.7 km || 
|-id=423 bgcolor=#fefefe
| 73423 ||  || — || June 10, 2002 || Socorro || LINEAR || V || align=right | 1.4 km || 
|-id=424 bgcolor=#d6d6d6
| 73424 ||  || — || June 10, 2002 || Socorro || LINEAR || — || align=right | 6.0 km || 
|-id=425 bgcolor=#fefefe
| 73425 ||  || — || June 10, 2002 || Socorro || LINEAR || — || align=right | 2.1 km || 
|-id=426 bgcolor=#d6d6d6
| 73426 ||  || — || June 10, 2002 || Socorro || LINEAR || — || align=right | 5.7 km || 
|-id=427 bgcolor=#fefefe
| 73427 ||  || — || June 10, 2002 || Socorro || LINEAR || V || align=right | 1.8 km || 
|-id=428 bgcolor=#d6d6d6
| 73428 ||  || — || June 6, 2002 || Socorro || LINEAR || — || align=right | 4.4 km || 
|-id=429 bgcolor=#d6d6d6
| 73429 ||  || — || June 13, 2002 || Socorro || LINEAR || ALA || align=right | 15 km || 
|-id=430 bgcolor=#d6d6d6
| 73430 ||  || — || June 12, 2002 || Palomar || NEAT || — || align=right | 5.2 km || 
|-id=431 bgcolor=#E9E9E9
| 73431 ||  || — || June 14, 2002 || Socorro || LINEAR || — || align=right | 4.9 km || 
|-id=432 bgcolor=#d6d6d6
| 73432 ||  || — || June 10, 2002 || Socorro || LINEAR || — || align=right | 8.2 km || 
|-id=433 bgcolor=#E9E9E9
| 73433 ||  || — || June 11, 2002 || Palomar || NEAT || PAD || align=right | 3.8 km || 
|-id=434 bgcolor=#d6d6d6
| 73434 ||  || — || June 14, 2002 || Socorro || LINEAR || — || align=right | 4.8 km || 
|-id=435 bgcolor=#E9E9E9
| 73435 || 2002 MS || — || June 18, 2002 || Reedy Creek || J. Broughton || — || align=right | 6.0 km || 
|-id=436 bgcolor=#d6d6d6
| 73436 ||  || — || June 16, 2002 || Palomar || NEAT || HIL3:2 || align=right | 11 km || 
|-id=437 bgcolor=#d6d6d6
| 73437 ||  || — || June 16, 2002 || Palomar || NEAT || — || align=right | 6.2 km || 
|-id=438 bgcolor=#fefefe
| 73438 ||  || — || June 17, 2002 || Socorro || LINEAR || — || align=right | 1.6 km || 
|-id=439 bgcolor=#E9E9E9
| 73439 ||  || — || June 17, 2002 || Haleakala || NEAT || — || align=right | 2.6 km || 
|-id=440 bgcolor=#E9E9E9
| 73440 ||  || — || June 29, 2002 || Palomar || NEAT || — || align=right | 4.8 km || 
|-id=441 bgcolor=#E9E9E9
| 73441 ||  || — || June 30, 2002 || Palomar || NEAT || — || align=right | 5.1 km || 
|-id=442 bgcolor=#d6d6d6
| 73442 Feruglio ||  ||  || July 10, 2002 || Campo Imperatore || CINEOS || — || align=right | 7.4 km || 
|-id=443 bgcolor=#d6d6d6
| 73443 ||  || — || July 4, 2002 || Palomar || NEAT || URS || align=right | 8.3 km || 
|-id=444 bgcolor=#d6d6d6
| 73444 ||  || — || July 4, 2002 || Palomar || NEAT || ALA || align=right | 10 km || 
|-id=445 bgcolor=#E9E9E9
| 73445 ||  || — || July 4, 2002 || Palomar || NEAT || CLO || align=right | 5.2 km || 
|-id=446 bgcolor=#d6d6d6
| 73446 ||  || — || July 4, 2002 || Palomar || NEAT || SAN || align=right | 5.5 km || 
|-id=447 bgcolor=#d6d6d6
| 73447 ||  || — || July 4, 2002 || Palomar || NEAT || — || align=right | 4.4 km || 
|-id=448 bgcolor=#d6d6d6
| 73448 ||  || — || July 4, 2002 || Palomar || NEAT || EOS || align=right | 5.3 km || 
|-id=449 bgcolor=#d6d6d6
| 73449 ||  || — || July 9, 2002 || Socorro || LINEAR || — || align=right | 8.6 km || 
|-id=450 bgcolor=#d6d6d6
| 73450 ||  || — || July 9, 2002 || Socorro || LINEAR || URS || align=right | 12 km || 
|-id=451 bgcolor=#d6d6d6
| 73451 ||  || — || July 6, 2002 || Anderson Mesa || LONEOS || EOS || align=right | 5.3 km || 
|-id=452 bgcolor=#d6d6d6
| 73452 ||  || — || July 13, 2002 || Palomar || NEAT || EOS || align=right | 6.0 km || 
|-id=453 bgcolor=#E9E9E9
| 73453 Ninomanfredi ||  ||  || July 13, 2002 || Campo Catino || G. Masi, F. Mallia || HOF || align=right | 5.4 km || 
|-id=454 bgcolor=#d6d6d6
| 73454 ||  || — || July 9, 2002 || Socorro || LINEAR || — || align=right | 5.8 km || 
|-id=455 bgcolor=#d6d6d6
| 73455 ||  || — || July 9, 2002 || Socorro || LINEAR || HIL3:2 || align=right | 8.8 km || 
|-id=456 bgcolor=#d6d6d6
| 73456 ||  || — || July 9, 2002 || Socorro || LINEAR || EOS || align=right | 6.0 km || 
|-id=457 bgcolor=#d6d6d6
| 73457 ||  || — || July 12, 2002 || Palomar || NEAT || HIL3:2 || align=right | 12 km || 
|-id=458 bgcolor=#d6d6d6
| 73458 ||  || — || July 4, 2002 || Palomar || NEAT || HIL3:2 || align=right | 11 km || 
|-id=459 bgcolor=#d6d6d6
| 73459 ||  || — || July 13, 2002 || Socorro || LINEAR || — || align=right | 7.1 km || 
|-id=460 bgcolor=#d6d6d6
| 73460 ||  || — || July 14, 2002 || Palomar || NEAT || — || align=right | 5.4 km || 
|-id=461 bgcolor=#d6d6d6
| 73461 ||  || — || July 14, 2002 || Socorro || LINEAR || EOS || align=right | 4.2 km || 
|-id=462 bgcolor=#d6d6d6
| 73462 ||  || — || July 14, 2002 || Palomar || NEAT || KOR || align=right | 3.5 km || 
|-id=463 bgcolor=#d6d6d6
| 73463 ||  || — || July 14, 2002 || Palomar || NEAT || EOS || align=right | 3.7 km || 
|-id=464 bgcolor=#d6d6d6
| 73464 ||  || — || July 5, 2002 || Palomar || NEAT || — || align=right | 3.8 km || 
|-id=465 bgcolor=#E9E9E9
| 73465 Buonanno ||  ||  || July 10, 2002 || Campo Imperatore || CINEOS || — || align=right | 3.6 km || 
|-id=466 bgcolor=#d6d6d6
| 73466 ||  || — || July 20, 2002 || Palomar || NEAT || EOS || align=right | 3.8 km || 
|-id=467 bgcolor=#d6d6d6
| 73467 ||  || — || July 20, 2002 || Palomar || NEAT || — || align=right | 8.4 km || 
|-id=468 bgcolor=#d6d6d6
| 73468 ||  || — || July 18, 2002 || Palomar || NEAT || — || align=right | 6.8 km || 
|-id=469 bgcolor=#d6d6d6
| 73469 ||  || — || July 18, 2002 || Socorro || LINEAR || — || align=right | 4.2 km || 
|-id=470 bgcolor=#d6d6d6
| 73470 ||  || — || July 18, 2002 || Socorro || LINEAR || — || align=right | 6.7 km || 
|-id=471 bgcolor=#d6d6d6
| 73471 ||  || — || July 18, 2002 || Socorro || LINEAR || BRA || align=right | 3.5 km || 
|-id=472 bgcolor=#d6d6d6
| 73472 ||  || — || July 18, 2002 || Socorro || LINEAR || — || align=right | 7.7 km || 
|-id=473 bgcolor=#d6d6d6
| 73473 ||  || — || July 18, 2002 || Socorro || LINEAR || EOS || align=right | 3.9 km || 
|-id=474 bgcolor=#E9E9E9
| 73474 ||  || — || July 18, 2002 || Socorro || LINEAR || — || align=right | 4.2 km || 
|-id=475 bgcolor=#d6d6d6
| 73475 ||  || — || August 5, 2002 || El Centro || Desert Wanderer Obs. || 3:2 || align=right | 12 km || 
|-id=476 bgcolor=#fefefe
| 73476 ||  || — || August 4, 2002 || Palomar || NEAT || V || align=right | 1.2 km || 
|-id=477 bgcolor=#d6d6d6
| 73477 ||  || — || August 6, 2002 || Palomar || NEAT || — || align=right | 4.1 km || 
|-id=478 bgcolor=#d6d6d6
| 73478 ||  || — || August 6, 2002 || Palomar || NEAT || — || align=right | 5.0 km || 
|-id=479 bgcolor=#d6d6d6
| 73479 ||  || — || August 6, 2002 || Palomar || NEAT || — || align=right | 6.0 km || 
|-id=480 bgcolor=#C2E0FF
| 73480 ||  || — || August 6, 2002 || Palomar || NEAT || centaurcritical || align=right | 87 km || 
|-id=481 bgcolor=#d6d6d6
| 73481 ||  || — || August 11, 2002 || Socorro || LINEAR || — || align=right | 9.8 km || 
|-id=482 bgcolor=#d6d6d6
| 73482 ||  || — || August 12, 2002 || Socorro || LINEAR || — || align=right | 6.0 km || 
|-id=483 bgcolor=#d6d6d6
| 73483 ||  || — || August 12, 2002 || Socorro || LINEAR || — || align=right | 9.1 km || 
|-id=484 bgcolor=#E9E9E9
| 73484 ||  || — || August 12, 2002 || Socorro || LINEAR || — || align=right | 4.9 km || 
|-id=485 bgcolor=#d6d6d6
| 73485 ||  || — || August 12, 2002 || Socorro || LINEAR || — || align=right | 8.1 km || 
|-id=486 bgcolor=#d6d6d6
| 73486 ||  || — || August 13, 2002 || Socorro || LINEAR || URS || align=right | 8.9 km || 
|-id=487 bgcolor=#E9E9E9
| 73487 ||  || — || August 11, 2002 || Socorro || LINEAR || — || align=right | 6.1 km || 
|-id=488 bgcolor=#d6d6d6
| 73488 ||  || — || August 11, 2002 || Socorro || LINEAR || — || align=right | 7.5 km || 
|-id=489 bgcolor=#d6d6d6
| 73489 ||  || — || August 13, 2002 || Anderson Mesa || LONEOS || — || align=right | 4.6 km || 
|-id=490 bgcolor=#d6d6d6
| 73490 ||  || — || August 12, 2002 || Anderson Mesa || LONEOS || — || align=right | 5.5 km || 
|-id=491 bgcolor=#E9E9E9
| 73491 Robmatson ||  ||  || August 8, 2002 || Palomar || S. F. Hönig || — || align=right | 4.3 km || 
|-id=492 bgcolor=#d6d6d6
| 73492 ||  || — || August 28, 2002 || Palomar || NEAT || THM || align=right | 6.0 km || 
|-id=493 bgcolor=#d6d6d6
| 73493 ||  || — || August 29, 2002 || Palomar || NEAT || — || align=right | 4.5 km || 
|-id=494 bgcolor=#d6d6d6
| 73494 ||  || — || August 30, 2002 || Palomar || NEAT || — || align=right | 9.6 km || 
|-id=495 bgcolor=#d6d6d6
| 73495 ||  || — || August 30, 2002 || Palomar || NEAT || — || align=right | 7.2 km || 
|-id=496 bgcolor=#d6d6d6
| 73496 ||  || — || September 4, 2002 || Palomar || NEAT || HYG || align=right | 6.2 km || 
|-id=497 bgcolor=#d6d6d6
| 73497 ||  || — || September 4, 2002 || Anderson Mesa || LONEOS || — || align=right | 7.4 km || 
|-id=498 bgcolor=#d6d6d6
| 73498 ||  || — || September 4, 2002 || Anderson Mesa || LONEOS || — || align=right | 5.8 km || 
|-id=499 bgcolor=#E9E9E9
| 73499 ||  || — || September 5, 2002 || Socorro || LINEAR || — || align=right | 4.6 km || 
|-id=500 bgcolor=#d6d6d6
| 73500 ||  || — || September 5, 2002 || Anderson Mesa || LONEOS || HYG || align=right | 6.9 km || 
|}

73501–73600 

|-bgcolor=#E9E9E9
| 73501 ||  || — || September 11, 2002 || Palomar || NEAT || — || align=right | 2.8 km || 
|-id=502 bgcolor=#d6d6d6
| 73502 ||  || — || September 13, 2002 || Anderson Mesa || LONEOS || — || align=right | 9.5 km || 
|-id=503 bgcolor=#fefefe
| 73503 ||  || — || October 2, 2002 || Socorro || LINEAR || — || align=right | 3.2 km || 
|-id=504 bgcolor=#E9E9E9
| 73504 ||  || — || October 2, 2002 || Haleakala || NEAT || — || align=right | 4.0 km || 
|-id=505 bgcolor=#d6d6d6
| 73505 ||  || — || October 4, 2002 || Palomar || NEAT || — || align=right | 9.1 km || 
|-id=506 bgcolor=#d6d6d6
| 73506 ||  || — || October 5, 2002 || Socorro || LINEAR || — || align=right | 13 km || 
|-id=507 bgcolor=#d6d6d6
| 73507 ||  || — || October 6, 2002 || Socorro || LINEAR || — || align=right | 8.7 km || 
|-id=508 bgcolor=#d6d6d6
| 73508 ||  || — || October 6, 2002 || Socorro || LINEAR || — || align=right | 10 km || 
|-id=509 bgcolor=#d6d6d6
| 73509 ||  || — || October 9, 2002 || Socorro || LINEAR || — || align=right | 5.4 km || 
|-id=510 bgcolor=#d6d6d6
| 73510 || 2002 UQ || — || October 22, 2002 || Palomar || NEAT || MEL || align=right | 9.4 km || 
|-id=511 bgcolor=#d6d6d6
| 73511 Lovas ||  ||  || December 25, 2002 || Piszkéstető || K. Sárneczky || — || align=right | 8.8 km || 
|-id=512 bgcolor=#fefefe
| 73512 ||  || — || January 1, 2003 || Socorro || LINEAR || — || align=right | 2.5 km || 
|-id=513 bgcolor=#fefefe
| 73513 ||  || — || January 26, 2003 || Anderson Mesa || LONEOS || V || align=right | 1.3 km || 
|-id=514 bgcolor=#d6d6d6
| 73514 ||  || — || January 27, 2003 || Socorro || LINEAR || — || align=right | 4.8 km || 
|-id=515 bgcolor=#fefefe
| 73515 ||  || — || March 5, 2003 || Socorro || LINEAR || NYS || align=right | 1.5 km || 
|-id=516 bgcolor=#E9E9E9
| 73516 ||  || — || March 7, 2003 || Socorro || LINEAR || — || align=right | 5.0 km || 
|-id=517 bgcolor=#d6d6d6
| 73517 Cranbrook ||  ||  || March 27, 2003 || Catalina || CSS || EOS || align=right | 4.9 km || 
|-id=518 bgcolor=#fefefe
| 73518 ||  || — || April 28, 2003 || Socorro || LINEAR || V || align=right | 2.1 km || 
|-id=519 bgcolor=#d6d6d6
| 73519 ||  || — || May 1, 2003 || Socorro || LINEAR || EOS || align=right | 3.5 km || 
|-id=520 bgcolor=#E9E9E9
| 73520 Boslough ||  ||  || June 22, 2003 || Anderson Mesa || LONEOS || INO || align=right | 3.5 km || 
|-id=521 bgcolor=#fefefe
| 73521 ||  || — || June 22, 2003 || Anderson Mesa || LONEOS || FLO || align=right | 1.5 km || 
|-id=522 bgcolor=#E9E9E9
| 73522 ||  || — || June 22, 2003 || Anderson Mesa || LONEOS || DOR || align=right | 8.0 km || 
|-id=523 bgcolor=#fefefe
| 73523 ||  || — || June 25, 2003 || Socorro || LINEAR || KLI || align=right | 3.9 km || 
|-id=524 bgcolor=#d6d6d6
| 73524 ||  || — || June 26, 2003 || Socorro || LINEAR || — || align=right | 9.9 km || 
|-id=525 bgcolor=#fefefe
| 73525 ||  || — || June 28, 2003 || Socorro || LINEAR || V || align=right | 1.5 km || 
|-id=526 bgcolor=#fefefe
| 73526 || 2003 NU || — || July 1, 2003 || Haleakala || NEAT || NYS || align=right | 1.4 km || 
|-id=527 bgcolor=#d6d6d6
| 73527 ||  || — || July 2, 2003 || Socorro || LINEAR || — || align=right | 11 km || 
|-id=528 bgcolor=#d6d6d6
| 73528 ||  || — || July 5, 2003 || Socorro || LINEAR || — || align=right | 12 km || 
|-id=529 bgcolor=#d6d6d6
| 73529 Giorgiopalumbo ||  ||  || July 22, 2003 || Campo Imperatore || CINEOS || EOS || align=right | 4.3 km || 
|-id=530 bgcolor=#fefefe
| 73530 ||  || — || July 22, 2003 || Haleakala || NEAT || — || align=right | 3.9 km || 
|-id=531 bgcolor=#fefefe
| 73531 ||  || — || July 22, 2003 || Haleakala || NEAT || MAS || align=right | 1.5 km || 
|-id=532 bgcolor=#d6d6d6
| 73532 ||  || — || July 22, 2003 || Haleakala || NEAT || — || align=right | 5.7 km || 
|-id=533 bgcolor=#fefefe
| 73533 Alonso ||  ||  || July 25, 2003 || Majorca || OAM Obs. || V || align=right | 1.7 km || 
|-id=534 bgcolor=#FA8072
| 73534 Liviasavioli ||  ||  || July 24, 2003 || Campo Imperatore || CINEOS || — || align=right | 1.3 km || 
|-id=535 bgcolor=#d6d6d6
| 73535 ||  || — || July 28, 2003 || Palomar || NEAT || 7:4 || align=right | 13 km || 
|-id=536 bgcolor=#d6d6d6
| 73536 ||  || — || July 22, 2003 || Palomar || NEAT || — || align=right | 8.4 km || 
|-id=537 bgcolor=#d6d6d6
| 73537 ||  || — || July 22, 2003 || Palomar || NEAT || — || align=right | 4.0 km || 
|-id=538 bgcolor=#d6d6d6
| 73538 ||  || — || July 22, 2003 || Palomar || NEAT || — || align=right | 5.0 km || 
|-id=539 bgcolor=#d6d6d6
| 73539 Carmenperrella ||  ||  || July 30, 2003 || Campo Imperatore || CINEOS || — || align=right | 9.0 km || 
|-id=540 bgcolor=#fefefe
| 73540 ||  || — || July 23, 2003 || Socorro || LINEAR || NYS || align=right | 1.5 km || 
|-id=541 bgcolor=#fefefe
| 73541 ||  || — || July 29, 2003 || Socorro || LINEAR || — || align=right | 2.0 km || 
|-id=542 bgcolor=#fefefe
| 73542 ||  || — || July 29, 2003 || Bergisch Gladbach || W. Bickel || — || align=right | 1.9 km || 
|-id=543 bgcolor=#d6d6d6
| 73543 ||  || — || July 24, 2003 || Palomar || NEAT || EOS || align=right | 3.9 km || 
|-id=544 bgcolor=#d6d6d6
| 73544 ||  || — || July 30, 2003 || Socorro || LINEAR || — || align=right | 9.1 km || 
|-id=545 bgcolor=#E9E9E9
| 73545 ||  || — || July 30, 2003 || Socorro || LINEAR || — || align=right | 6.5 km || 
|-id=546 bgcolor=#fefefe
| 73546 ||  || — || July 30, 2003 || Socorro || LINEAR || — || align=right | 2.0 km || 
|-id=547 bgcolor=#E9E9E9
| 73547 || 2003 PW || — || August 1, 2003 || Socorro || LINEAR || — || align=right | 4.0 km || 
|-id=548 bgcolor=#E9E9E9
| 73548 ||  || — || August 2, 2003 || Haleakala || NEAT || — || align=right | 3.5 km || 
|-id=549 bgcolor=#fefefe
| 73549 ||  || — || August 3, 2003 || Haleakala || NEAT || — || align=right | 1.7 km || 
|-id=550 bgcolor=#fefefe
| 73550 ||  || — || August 4, 2003 || Socorro || LINEAR || — || align=right | 2.5 km || 
|-id=551 bgcolor=#d6d6d6
| 73551 Dariocastellano || 2003 QV ||  || August 18, 2003 || Campo Imperatore || CINEOS || EOS || align=right | 3.9 km || 
|-id=552 bgcolor=#E9E9E9
| 73552 ||  || — || August 22, 2003 || Haleakala || NEAT || — || align=right | 2.1 km || 
|-id=553 bgcolor=#E9E9E9
| 73553 ||  || — || August 22, 2003 || Reedy Creek || J. Broughton || DOR || align=right | 5.6 km || 
|-id=554 bgcolor=#d6d6d6
| 73554 || 2124 P-L || — || September 24, 1960 || Palomar || PLS || — || align=right | 5.9 km || 
|-id=555 bgcolor=#fefefe
| 73555 || 2129 P-L || — || September 24, 1960 || Palomar || PLS || V || align=right | 2.0 km || 
|-id=556 bgcolor=#d6d6d6
| 73556 || 2130 P-L || — || September 24, 1960 || Palomar || PLS || — || align=right | 8.5 km || 
|-id=557 bgcolor=#fefefe
| 73557 || 2131 P-L || — || September 24, 1960 || Palomar || PLS || — || align=right | 1.8 km || 
|-id=558 bgcolor=#d6d6d6
| 73558 || 2567 P-L || — || September 24, 1960 || Palomar || PLS || KOR || align=right | 3.2 km || 
|-id=559 bgcolor=#fefefe
| 73559 || 2665 P-L || — || September 24, 1960 || Palomar || PLS || — || align=right | 1.5 km || 
|-id=560 bgcolor=#fefefe
| 73560 || 2737 P-L || — || September 24, 1960 || Palomar || PLS || — || align=right | 1.9 km || 
|-id=561 bgcolor=#fefefe
| 73561 || 2803 P-L || — || September 24, 1960 || Palomar || PLS || — || align=right | 1.6 km || 
|-id=562 bgcolor=#fefefe
| 73562 || 2810 P-L || — || September 24, 1960 || Palomar || PLS || — || align=right | 1.6 km || 
|-id=563 bgcolor=#d6d6d6
| 73563 || 3009 P-L || — || September 24, 1960 || Palomar || PLS || EOS || align=right | 4.0 km || 
|-id=564 bgcolor=#E9E9E9
| 73564 || 4051 P-L || — || September 24, 1960 || Palomar || PLS || — || align=right | 4.4 km || 
|-id=565 bgcolor=#fefefe
| 73565 || 4252 P-L || — || September 24, 1960 || Palomar || PLS || — || align=right | 1.2 km || 
|-id=566 bgcolor=#d6d6d6
| 73566 || 4259 P-L || — || September 24, 1960 || Palomar || PLS || — || align=right | 5.7 km || 
|-id=567 bgcolor=#d6d6d6
| 73567 || 4509 P-L || — || September 24, 1960 || Palomar || PLS || — || align=right | 6.6 km || 
|-id=568 bgcolor=#fefefe
| 73568 || 4656 P-L || — || September 24, 1960 || Palomar || PLS || — || align=right | 1.9 km || 
|-id=569 bgcolor=#d6d6d6
| 73569 || 4659 P-L || — || September 24, 1960 || Palomar || PLS || EMA || align=right | 6.6 km || 
|-id=570 bgcolor=#d6d6d6
| 73570 || 4736 P-L || — || September 24, 1960 || Palomar || PLS || — || align=right | 5.6 km || 
|-id=571 bgcolor=#E9E9E9
| 73571 || 4755 P-L || — || September 24, 1960 || Palomar || PLS || — || align=right | 2.9 km || 
|-id=572 bgcolor=#E9E9E9
| 73572 || 4765 P-L || — || September 24, 1960 || Palomar || PLS || — || align=right | 3.6 km || 
|-id=573 bgcolor=#d6d6d6
| 73573 || 4766 P-L || — || September 24, 1960 || Palomar || PLS || — || align=right | 7.5 km || 
|-id=574 bgcolor=#fefefe
| 73574 || 4783 P-L || — || September 24, 1960 || Palomar || PLS || — || align=right | 5.5 km || 
|-id=575 bgcolor=#FA8072
| 73575 || 4789 P-L || — || September 24, 1960 || Palomar || PLS || — || align=right | 1.00 km || 
|-id=576 bgcolor=#d6d6d6
| 73576 || 4812 P-L || — || September 24, 1960 || Palomar || PLS || — || align=right | 5.2 km || 
|-id=577 bgcolor=#d6d6d6
| 73577 || 4818 P-L || — || September 24, 1960 || Palomar || PLS || — || align=right | 8.8 km || 
|-id=578 bgcolor=#d6d6d6
| 73578 || 6277 P-L || — || September 24, 1960 || Palomar || PLS || — || align=right | 5.9 km || 
|-id=579 bgcolor=#E9E9E9
| 73579 || 6284 P-L || — || September 24, 1960 || Palomar || PLS || — || align=right | 2.7 km || 
|-id=580 bgcolor=#fefefe
| 73580 || 6285 P-L || — || September 24, 1960 || Palomar || PLS || FLO || align=right | 1.3 km || 
|-id=581 bgcolor=#fefefe
| 73581 || 6772 P-L || — || September 24, 1960 || Palomar || PLS || NYS || align=right | 4.6 km || 
|-id=582 bgcolor=#fefefe
| 73582 || 2249 T-1 || — || March 25, 1971 || Palomar || PLS || — || align=right | 2.8 km || 
|-id=583 bgcolor=#d6d6d6
| 73583 || 3092 T-1 || — || March 26, 1971 || Palomar || PLS || — || align=right | 4.9 km || 
|-id=584 bgcolor=#fefefe
| 73584 || 3228 T-1 || — || March 26, 1971 || Palomar || PLS || NYS || align=right | 1.7 km || 
|-id=585 bgcolor=#d6d6d6
| 73585 || 3339 T-1 || — || March 26, 1971 || Palomar || PLS || CHA || align=right | 4.6 km || 
|-id=586 bgcolor=#fefefe
| 73586 || 4141 T-1 || — || March 26, 1971 || Palomar || PLS || EUT || align=right | 1.4 km || 
|-id=587 bgcolor=#fefefe
| 73587 || 1020 T-2 || — || September 29, 1973 || Palomar || PLS || V || align=right | 1.4 km || 
|-id=588 bgcolor=#fefefe
| 73588 || 1067 T-2 || — || September 29, 1973 || Palomar || PLS || NYS || align=right | 1.9 km || 
|-id=589 bgcolor=#fefefe
| 73589 || 1114 T-2 || — || September 29, 1973 || Palomar || PLS || MAS || align=right | 1.4 km || 
|-id=590 bgcolor=#fefefe
| 73590 || 1258 T-2 || — || September 29, 1973 || Palomar || PLS || — || align=right | 2.5 km || 
|-id=591 bgcolor=#fefefe
| 73591 || 1359 T-2 || — || September 30, 1973 || Palomar || PLS || FLO || align=right | 1.5 km || 
|-id=592 bgcolor=#fefefe
| 73592 || 1401 T-2 || — || September 29, 1973 || Palomar || PLS || NYS || align=right | 1.5 km || 
|-id=593 bgcolor=#fefefe
| 73593 || 1806 T-2 || — || September 24, 1973 || Palomar || PLS || NYS || align=right | 1.4 km || 
|-id=594 bgcolor=#fefefe
| 73594 || 2014 T-2 || — || September 29, 1973 || Palomar || PLS || FLO || align=right | 1.6 km || 
|-id=595 bgcolor=#fefefe
| 73595 || 2129 T-2 || — || September 29, 1973 || Palomar || PLS || — || align=right | 2.1 km || 
|-id=596 bgcolor=#d6d6d6
| 73596 || 2147 T-2 || — || September 29, 1973 || Palomar || PLS || NAE || align=right | 6.6 km || 
|-id=597 bgcolor=#E9E9E9
| 73597 || 2188 T-2 || — || September 29, 1973 || Palomar || PLS || — || align=right | 2.4 km || 
|-id=598 bgcolor=#fefefe
| 73598 || 2912 T-2 || — || September 30, 1973 || Palomar || PLS || — || align=right | 1.1 km || 
|-id=599 bgcolor=#fefefe
| 73599 || 3012 T-2 || — || September 30, 1973 || Palomar || PLS || — || align=right | 1.5 km || 
|-id=600 bgcolor=#d6d6d6
| 73600 || 3020 T-2 || — || September 30, 1973 || Palomar || PLS || — || align=right | 5.0 km || 
|}

73601–73700 

|-bgcolor=#d6d6d6
| 73601 || 3045 T-2 || — || September 30, 1973 || Palomar || PLS || — || align=right | 5.1 km || 
|-id=602 bgcolor=#E9E9E9
| 73602 || 3053 T-2 || — || September 30, 1973 || Palomar || PLS || — || align=right | 3.9 km || 
|-id=603 bgcolor=#E9E9E9
| 73603 || 3214 T-2 || — || September 30, 1973 || Palomar || PLS || — || align=right | 4.1 km || 
|-id=604 bgcolor=#fefefe
| 73604 || 4039 T-2 || — || September 29, 1973 || Palomar || PLS || NYS || align=right | 1.9 km || 
|-id=605 bgcolor=#E9E9E9
| 73605 || 4041 T-2 || — || September 29, 1973 || Palomar || PLS || — || align=right | 5.2 km || 
|-id=606 bgcolor=#E9E9E9
| 73606 || 4079 T-2 || — || September 29, 1973 || Palomar || PLS || — || align=right | 3.1 km || 
|-id=607 bgcolor=#d6d6d6
| 73607 || 4092 T-2 || — || September 29, 1973 || Palomar || PLS || — || align=right | 5.1 km || 
|-id=608 bgcolor=#fefefe
| 73608 || 4155 T-2 || — || September 29, 1973 || Palomar || PLS || FLO || align=right | 2.1 km || 
|-id=609 bgcolor=#E9E9E9
| 73609 || 5114 T-2 || — || September 25, 1973 || Palomar || PLS || — || align=right | 3.3 km || 
|-id=610 bgcolor=#fefefe
| 73610 Klyuchevskaya || 1054 T-3 ||  || October 17, 1977 || Palomar || PLS || H || align=right | 1.1 km || 
|-id=611 bgcolor=#E9E9E9
| 73611 || 2127 T-3 || — || October 16, 1977 || Palomar || PLS || — || align=right | 7.0 km || 
|-id=612 bgcolor=#d6d6d6
| 73612 || 2178 T-3 || — || October 16, 1977 || Palomar || PLS || — || align=right | 5.8 km || 
|-id=613 bgcolor=#fefefe
| 73613 || 2213 T-3 || — || October 16, 1977 || Palomar || PLS || V || align=right | 1.5 km || 
|-id=614 bgcolor=#E9E9E9
| 73614 || 2229 T-3 || — || October 16, 1977 || Palomar || PLS || — || align=right | 6.2 km || 
|-id=615 bgcolor=#E9E9E9
| 73615 || 2353 T-3 || — || October 16, 1977 || Palomar || PLS || — || align=right | 2.8 km || 
|-id=616 bgcolor=#d6d6d6
| 73616 || 2383 T-3 || — || October 16, 1977 || Palomar || PLS || — || align=right | 4.9 km || 
|-id=617 bgcolor=#E9E9E9
| 73617 || 2437 T-3 || — || October 16, 1977 || Palomar || PLS || — || align=right | 4.4 km || 
|-id=618 bgcolor=#d6d6d6
| 73618 || 2458 T-3 || — || October 16, 1977 || Palomar || PLS || — || align=right | 3.7 km || 
|-id=619 bgcolor=#E9E9E9
| 73619 || 3322 T-3 || — || October 16, 1977 || Palomar || PLS || — || align=right | 6.8 km || 
|-id=620 bgcolor=#fefefe
| 73620 || 3346 T-3 || — || October 16, 1977 || Palomar || PLS || — || align=right | 1.6 km || 
|-id=621 bgcolor=#fefefe
| 73621 || 3381 T-3 || — || October 16, 1977 || Palomar || PLS || NYS || align=right | 3.4 km || 
|-id=622 bgcolor=#d6d6d6
| 73622 || 3418 T-3 || — || October 16, 1977 || Palomar || PLS || — || align=right | 6.6 km || 
|-id=623 bgcolor=#d6d6d6
| 73623 || 3477 T-3 || — || October 16, 1977 || Palomar || PLS || — || align=right | 4.1 km || 
|-id=624 bgcolor=#fefefe
| 73624 || 3481 T-3 || — || October 16, 1977 || Palomar || PLS || — || align=right | 2.0 km || 
|-id=625 bgcolor=#fefefe
| 73625 || 3524 T-3 || — || October 16, 1977 || Palomar || PLS || — || align=right | 1.6 km || 
|-id=626 bgcolor=#fefefe
| 73626 || 3939 T-3 || — || October 16, 1977 || Palomar || PLS || — || align=right | 1.5 km || 
|-id=627 bgcolor=#fefefe
| 73627 || 4040 T-3 || — || October 16, 1977 || Palomar || PLS || NYS || align=right | 1.6 km || 
|-id=628 bgcolor=#fefefe
| 73628 || 4170 T-3 || — || October 16, 1977 || Palomar || PLS || NYS || align=right | 4.7 km || 
|-id=629 bgcolor=#d6d6d6
| 73629 || 4303 T-3 || — || October 16, 1977 || Palomar || PLS || EMA || align=right | 7.4 km || 
|-id=630 bgcolor=#E9E9E9
| 73630 || 4352 T-3 || — || October 16, 1977 || Palomar || PLS || — || align=right | 5.8 km || 
|-id=631 bgcolor=#E9E9E9
| 73631 || 4367 T-3 || — || October 16, 1977 || Palomar || PLS || — || align=right | 4.1 km || 
|-id=632 bgcolor=#fefefe
| 73632 || 4432 T-3 || — || October 11, 1977 || Palomar || PLS || — || align=right | 4.3 km || 
|-id=633 bgcolor=#d6d6d6
| 73633 || 4702 T-3 || — || October 16, 1977 || Palomar || PLS || — || align=right | 6.8 km || 
|-id=634 bgcolor=#d6d6d6
| 73634 || 5077 T-3 || — || October 16, 1977 || Palomar || PLS || JLI || align=right | 6.4 km || 
|-id=635 bgcolor=#d6d6d6
| 73635 || 5105 T-3 || — || October 16, 1977 || Palomar || PLS || TEL || align=right | 3.1 km || 
|-id=636 bgcolor=#E9E9E9
| 73636 || 5727 T-3 || — || October 16, 1977 || Palomar || PLS || EUN || align=right | 3.2 km || 
|-id=637 bgcolor=#C2FFFF
| 73637 Guneus ||  ||  || September 19, 1973 || Palomar || PLS || L4 || align=right | 16 km || 
|-id=638 bgcolor=#d6d6d6
| 73638 Likhanov ||  ||  || November 8, 1975 || Nauchnyj || N. S. Chernykh || — || align=right | 10 km || 
|-id=639 bgcolor=#d6d6d6
| 73639 ||  || — || March 12, 1977 || Kiso || H. Kosai, K. Furukawa || — || align=right | 5.9 km || 
|-id=640 bgcolor=#E9E9E9
| 73640 Biermann || 1977 RM ||  || September 5, 1977 || La Silla || H.-E. Schuster || — || align=right | 6.1 km || 
|-id=641 bgcolor=#C2FFFF
| 73641 ||  || — || October 18, 1977 || Palomar || S. J. Bus || L5 || align=right | 15 km || 
|-id=642 bgcolor=#E9E9E9
| 73642 ||  || — || September 2, 1978 || La Silla || C.-I. Lagerkvist || — || align=right | 1.8 km || 
|-id=643 bgcolor=#fefefe
| 73643 ||  || — || October 27, 1978 || Palomar || C. M. Olmstead || NYS || align=right | 1.3 km || 
|-id=644 bgcolor=#fefefe
| 73644 ||  || — || October 27, 1978 || Palomar || C. M. Olmstead || — || align=right | 3.4 km || 
|-id=645 bgcolor=#E9E9E9
| 73645 ||  || — || November 7, 1978 || Palomar || E. F. Helin, S. J. Bus || — || align=right | 3.1 km || 
|-id=646 bgcolor=#E9E9E9
| 73646 ||  || — || November 7, 1978 || Palomar || E. F. Helin, S. J. Bus || — || align=right | 4.1 km || 
|-id=647 bgcolor=#E9E9E9
| 73647 ||  || — || November 7, 1978 || Palomar || E. F. Helin, S. J. Bus || — || align=right | 3.0 km || 
|-id=648 bgcolor=#fefefe
| 73648 ||  || — || June 25, 1979 || Siding Spring || E. F. Helin, S. J. Bus || — || align=right | 1.3 km || 
|-id=649 bgcolor=#d6d6d6
| 73649 ||  || — || June 25, 1979 || Siding Spring || E. F. Helin, S. J. Bus || — || align=right | 6.1 km || 
|-id=650 bgcolor=#fefefe
| 73650 || 1981 DN || — || February 28, 1981 || Siding Spring || S. J. Bus || — || align=right | 2.1 km || 
|-id=651 bgcolor=#d6d6d6
| 73651 ||  || — || March 2, 1981 || Siding Spring || S. J. Bus || — || align=right | 4.4 km || 
|-id=652 bgcolor=#fefefe
| 73652 ||  || — || March 2, 1981 || Siding Spring || S. J. Bus || — || align=right | 1.9 km || 
|-id=653 bgcolor=#fefefe
| 73653 ||  || — || March 6, 1981 || Siding Spring || S. J. Bus || — || align=right | 1.8 km || 
|-id=654 bgcolor=#d6d6d6
| 73654 ||  || — || March 6, 1981 || Siding Spring || S. J. Bus || 3:2 || align=right | 14 km || 
|-id=655 bgcolor=#d6d6d6
| 73655 ||  || — || March 1, 1981 || Siding Spring || S. J. Bus || 7:4 || align=right | 10 km || 
|-id=656 bgcolor=#fefefe
| 73656 ||  || — || March 1, 1981 || Siding Spring || S. J. Bus || — || align=right | 2.0 km || 
|-id=657 bgcolor=#fefefe
| 73657 ||  || — || March 1, 1981 || Siding Spring || S. J. Bus || — || align=right | 2.8 km || 
|-id=658 bgcolor=#fefefe
| 73658 ||  || — || March 1, 1981 || Siding Spring || S. J. Bus || — || align=right | 2.4 km || 
|-id=659 bgcolor=#E9E9E9
| 73659 ||  || — || March 6, 1981 || Siding Spring || S. J. Bus || — || align=right | 2.2 km || 
|-id=660 bgcolor=#E9E9E9
| 73660 ||  || — || March 2, 1981 || Siding Spring || S. J. Bus || — || align=right | 4.5 km || 
|-id=661 bgcolor=#fefefe
| 73661 ||  || — || March 2, 1981 || Siding Spring || S. J. Bus || — || align=right | 2.0 km || 
|-id=662 bgcolor=#fefefe
| 73662 ||  || — || March 2, 1981 || Siding Spring || S. J. Bus || — || align=right | 1.3 km || 
|-id=663 bgcolor=#fefefe
| 73663 ||  || — || March 2, 1981 || Siding Spring || S. J. Bus || FLO || align=right | 1.6 km || 
|-id=664 bgcolor=#fefefe
| 73664 ||  || — || March 1, 1981 || Siding Spring || S. J. Bus || NYS || align=right | 1.1 km || 
|-id=665 bgcolor=#fefefe
| 73665 ||  || — || March 2, 1981 || Siding Spring || S. J. Bus || — || align=right | 2.0 km || 
|-id=666 bgcolor=#fefefe
| 73666 ||  || — || March 1, 1981 || Siding Spring || S. J. Bus || V || align=right | 1.5 km || 
|-id=667 bgcolor=#fefefe
| 73667 ||  || — || March 1, 1981 || Siding Spring || S. J. Bus || — || align=right | 1.7 km || 
|-id=668 bgcolor=#fefefe
| 73668 ||  || — || March 6, 1981 || Siding Spring || S. J. Bus || — || align=right | 2.1 km || 
|-id=669 bgcolor=#FA8072
| 73669 ||  || — || November 25, 1981 || Palomar || C. T. Kowal || H || align=right | 2.0 km || 
|-id=670 bgcolor=#fefefe
| 73670 Kurthopf || 1982 QP ||  || August 19, 1982 || Palomar || C. S. Shoemaker, E. M. Shoemaker || — || align=right | 4.6 km || 
|-id=671 bgcolor=#E9E9E9
| 73671 ||  || — || January 26, 1984 || Palomar || E. Bowell || — || align=right | 2.2 km || 
|-id=672 bgcolor=#fefefe
| 73672 || 1986 QR || — || August 26, 1986 || La Silla || H. Debehogne || FLO || align=right | 2.6 km || 
|-id=673 bgcolor=#FA8072
| 73673 ||  || — || September 6, 1986 || Palomar || E. F. Helin || — || align=right | 3.4 km || 
|-id=674 bgcolor=#d6d6d6
| 73674 ||  || — || January 28, 1988 || Siding Spring || R. H. McNaught || THB || align=right | 6.4 km || 
|-id=675 bgcolor=#E9E9E9
| 73675 || 1988 CF || — || February 8, 1988 || Kushiro || S. Ueda, H. Kaneda || — || align=right | 3.6 km || 
|-id=676 bgcolor=#d6d6d6
| 73676 ||  || — || February 13, 1988 || La Silla || E. W. Elst || EOS || align=right | 6.1 km || 
|-id=677 bgcolor=#C2FFFF
| 73677 ||  || — || September 16, 1988 || Cerro Tololo || S. J. Bus || L5 || align=right | 25 km || 
|-id=678 bgcolor=#fefefe
| 73678 || 1988 TY || — || October 13, 1988 || Kushiro || S. Ueda, H. Kaneda || — || align=right | 1.9 km || 
|-id=679 bgcolor=#fefefe
| 73679 ||  || — || September 26, 1989 || La Silla || E. W. Elst || — || align=right | 1.4 km || 
|-id=680 bgcolor=#fefefe
| 73680 ||  || — || September 28, 1989 || La Silla || H. Debehogne || — || align=right | 1.9 km || 
|-id=681 bgcolor=#FA8072
| 73681 ||  || — || October 2, 1989 || Palomar || E. F. Helin, K. J. Lawrence || — || align=right | 1.8 km || 
|-id=682 bgcolor=#d6d6d6
| 73682 ||  || — || April 29, 1990 || Siding Spring || A. Żytkow, M. J. Irwin || — || align=right | 7.7 km || 
|-id=683 bgcolor=#E9E9E9
| 73683 ||  || — || September 14, 1990 || Palomar || H. E. Holt || — || align=right | 2.4 km || 
|-id=684 bgcolor=#E9E9E9
| 73684 || 1990 SV || — || September 16, 1990 || Palomar || H. E. Holt || — || align=right | 2.4 km || 
|-id=685 bgcolor=#E9E9E9
| 73685 ||  || — || September 22, 1990 || La Silla || E. W. Elst || — || align=right | 3.9 km || 
|-id=686 bgcolor=#E9E9E9
| 73686 Nussdorf ||  ||  || October 10, 1990 || Tautenburg Observatory || L. D. Schmadel, F. Börngen || — || align=right | 1.8 km || 
|-id=687 bgcolor=#E9E9E9
| 73687 Thomas Aquinas ||  ||  || October 10, 1990 || Tautenburg Observatory || F. Börngen, L. D. Schmadel || MAR || align=right | 4.3 km || 
|-id=688 bgcolor=#E9E9E9
| 73688 ||  || — || November 15, 1990 || La Silla || E. W. Elst || — || align=right | 2.7 km || 
|-id=689 bgcolor=#fefefe
| 73689 || 1991 FK || — || March 17, 1991 || Kiyosato || S. Otomo, O. Muramatsu || H || align=right | 1.9 km || 
|-id=690 bgcolor=#d6d6d6
| 73690 ||  || — || August 2, 1991 || La Silla || E. W. Elst || TIR || align=right | 11 km || 
|-id=691 bgcolor=#d6d6d6
| 73691 ||  || — || August 2, 1991 || La Silla || E. W. Elst || ALA || align=right | 11 km || 
|-id=692 bgcolor=#fefefe
| 73692 Gürtler ||  ||  || September 12, 1991 || Tautenburg Observatory || L. D. Schmadel, F. Börngen || — || align=right | 2.9 km || 
|-id=693 bgcolor=#d6d6d6
| 73693 Dorschner ||  ||  || September 12, 1991 || Tautenburg Observatory || F. Börngen, L. D. Schmadel || — || align=right | 5.6 km || 
|-id=694 bgcolor=#d6d6d6
| 73694 ||  || — || September 15, 1991 || Palomar || H. E. Holt || — || align=right | 13 km || 
|-id=695 bgcolor=#fefefe
| 73695 ||  || — || September 11, 1991 || Palomar || H. E. Holt || NYS || align=right | 2.9 km || 
|-id=696 bgcolor=#fefefe
| 73696 ||  || — || September 14, 1991 || Palomar || H. E. Holt || — || align=right | 3.4 km || 
|-id=697 bgcolor=#fefefe
| 73697 ||  || — || September 12, 1991 || Palomar || H. E. Holt || — || align=right | 3.8 km || 
|-id=698 bgcolor=#d6d6d6
| 73698 || 1991 TE || — || October 1, 1991 || Siding Spring || R. H. McNaught || THB || align=right | 10 km || 
|-id=699 bgcolor=#E9E9E9
| 73699 Landaupfalz ||  ||  || October 4, 1991 || Tautenburg Observatory || L. D. Schmadel, F. Börngen || — || align=right | 2.7 km || 
|-id=700 bgcolor=#d6d6d6
| 73700 von Kues ||  ||  || October 5, 1991 || Tautenburg Observatory || F. Börngen, L. D. Schmadel || — || align=right | 7.7 km || 
|}

73701–73800 

|-bgcolor=#fefefe
| 73701 Siegfriedbauer ||  ||  || October 3, 1991 || Tautenburg Observatory || L. D. Schmadel, F. Börngen || — || align=right | 2.3 km || 
|-id=702 bgcolor=#d6d6d6
| 73702 ||  || — || October 10, 1991 || Kitt Peak || Spacewatch || — || align=right | 3.2 km || 
|-id=703 bgcolor=#d6d6d6
| 73703 Billings ||  ||  || October 6, 1991 || Palomar || A. Lowe || EOS || align=right | 4.1 km || 
|-id=704 bgcolor=#d6d6d6
| 73704 Hladiuk ||  ||  || October 6, 1991 || Palomar || A. Lowe || — || align=right | 4.5 km || 
|-id=705 bgcolor=#fefefe
| 73705 ||  || — || October 31, 1991 || Kitami || A. Takahashi, K. Watanabe || — || align=right | 2.1 km || 
|-id=706 bgcolor=#fefefe
| 73706 ||  || — || November 4, 1991 || Kitt Peak || Spacewatch || NYS || align=right | 1.8 km || 
|-id=707 bgcolor=#d6d6d6
| 73707 ||  || — || November 5, 1991 || Kitt Peak || Spacewatch || THM || align=right | 7.7 km || 
|-id=708 bgcolor=#E9E9E9
| 73708 || 1992 DV || — || February 25, 1992 || Kushiro || S. Ueda, H. Kaneda || — || align=right | 2.2 km || 
|-id=709 bgcolor=#fefefe
| 73709 ||  || — || February 29, 1992 || La Silla || UESAC || — || align=right | 1.5 km || 
|-id=710 bgcolor=#fefefe
| 73710 ||  || — || March 4, 1992 || La Silla || UESAC || NYS || align=right | 1.3 km || 
|-id=711 bgcolor=#E9E9E9
| 73711 ||  || — || March 4, 1992 || La Silla || UESAC || — || align=right | 4.1 km || 
|-id=712 bgcolor=#fefefe
| 73712 ||  || — || September 2, 1992 || La Silla || E. W. Elst || NYS || align=right | 3.6 km || 
|-id=713 bgcolor=#d6d6d6
| 73713 ||  || — || September 2, 1992 || La Silla || E. W. Elst || — || align=right | 4.6 km || 
|-id=714 bgcolor=#fefefe
| 73714 ||  || — || September 30, 1992 || Palomar || H. E. Holt || PHO || align=right | 3.2 km || 
|-id=715 bgcolor=#d6d6d6
| 73715 ||  || — || September 22, 1992 || La Silla || E. W. Elst || — || align=right | 5.3 km || 
|-id=716 bgcolor=#fefefe
| 73716 ||  || — || December 24, 1992 || Kitt Peak || Spacewatch || — || align=right | 2.2 km || 
|-id=717 bgcolor=#fefefe
| 73717 ||  || — || January 27, 1993 || Caussols || E. W. Elst || — || align=right | 2.2 km || 
|-id=718 bgcolor=#d6d6d6
| 73718 ||  || — || January 27, 1993 || Caussols || E. W. Elst || — || align=right | 7.4 km || 
|-id=719 bgcolor=#E9E9E9
| 73719 || 1993 FT || — || March 22, 1993 || Stroncone || A. Vagnozzi || — || align=right | 2.0 km || 
|-id=720 bgcolor=#E9E9E9
| 73720 ||  || — || March 17, 1993 || La Silla || UESAC || — || align=right | 2.7 km || 
|-id=721 bgcolor=#d6d6d6
| 73721 ||  || — || March 17, 1993 || La Silla || UESAC || HYG || align=right | 5.9 km || 
|-id=722 bgcolor=#E9E9E9
| 73722 ||  || — || March 17, 1993 || La Silla || UESAC || — || align=right | 1.9 km || 
|-id=723 bgcolor=#fefefe
| 73723 ||  || — || March 19, 1993 || La Silla || UESAC || NYS || align=right | 1.4 km || 
|-id=724 bgcolor=#E9E9E9
| 73724 ||  || — || March 21, 1993 || La Silla || UESAC || KON || align=right | 5.1 km || 
|-id=725 bgcolor=#E9E9E9
| 73725 ||  || — || March 21, 1993 || La Silla || UESAC || — || align=right | 2.2 km || 
|-id=726 bgcolor=#E9E9E9
| 73726 ||  || — || March 21, 1993 || La Silla || UESAC || — || align=right | 4.2 km || 
|-id=727 bgcolor=#fefefe
| 73727 ||  || — || March 19, 1993 || La Silla || UESAC || — || align=right | 3.4 km || 
|-id=728 bgcolor=#fefefe
| 73728 ||  || — || March 19, 1993 || La Silla || UESAC || NYS || align=right | 1.6 km || 
|-id=729 bgcolor=#fefefe
| 73729 ||  || — || March 19, 1993 || La Silla || UESAC || NYS || align=right | 2.0 km || 
|-id=730 bgcolor=#fefefe
| 73730 ||  || — || March 19, 1993 || La Silla || UESAC || — || align=right | 4.2 km || 
|-id=731 bgcolor=#fefefe
| 73731 ||  || — || March 19, 1993 || La Silla || UESAC || V || align=right | 2.1 km || 
|-id=732 bgcolor=#fefefe
| 73732 ||  || — || March 19, 1993 || La Silla || UESAC || MAS || align=right | 1.7 km || 
|-id=733 bgcolor=#E9E9E9
| 73733 ||  || — || March 19, 1993 || La Silla || UESAC || — || align=right | 5.8 km || 
|-id=734 bgcolor=#E9E9E9
| 73734 ||  || — || July 19, 1993 || La Silla || E. W. Elst || — || align=right | 7.5 km || 
|-id=735 bgcolor=#FA8072
| 73735 ||  || — || August 18, 1993 || Caussols || E. W. Elst || — || align=right | 1.3 km || 
|-id=736 bgcolor=#E9E9E9
| 73736 ||  || — || August 20, 1993 || La Silla || E. W. Elst || HOF || align=right | 5.1 km || 
|-id=737 bgcolor=#E9E9E9
| 73737 ||  || — || September 15, 1993 || La Silla || E. W. Elst || — || align=right | 5.4 km || 
|-id=738 bgcolor=#E9E9E9
| 73738 ||  || — || September 15, 1993 || La Silla || E. W. Elst || MAR || align=right | 4.3 km || 
|-id=739 bgcolor=#fefefe
| 73739 ||  || — || September 17, 1993 || La Silla || E. W. Elst || — || align=right | 1.6 km || 
|-id=740 bgcolor=#E9E9E9
| 73740 ||  || — || October 9, 1993 || La Silla || E. W. Elst || MAR || align=right | 3.3 km || 
|-id=741 bgcolor=#E9E9E9
| 73741 ||  || — || October 9, 1993 || La Silla || E. W. Elst || EUN || align=right | 2.8 km || 
|-id=742 bgcolor=#E9E9E9
| 73742 ||  || — || October 9, 1993 || La Silla || E. W. Elst || — || align=right | 5.2 km || 
|-id=743 bgcolor=#fefefe
| 73743 ||  || — || October 9, 1993 || La Silla || E. W. Elst || — || align=right | 1.8 km || 
|-id=744 bgcolor=#d6d6d6
| 73744 ||  || — || October 9, 1993 || La Silla || E. W. Elst || TRP || align=right | 5.7 km || 
|-id=745 bgcolor=#fefefe
| 73745 ||  || — || October 9, 1993 || La Silla || E. W. Elst || — || align=right | 1.6 km || 
|-id=746 bgcolor=#fefefe
| 73746 ||  || — || October 9, 1993 || La Silla || E. W. Elst || — || align=right | 1.3 km || 
|-id=747 bgcolor=#fefefe
| 73747 ||  || — || October 9, 1993 || La Silla || E. W. Elst || — || align=right | 1.4 km || 
|-id=748 bgcolor=#E9E9E9
| 73748 ||  || — || October 9, 1993 || La Silla || E. W. Elst || — || align=right | 4.1 km || 
|-id=749 bgcolor=#fefefe
| 73749 ||  || — || October 9, 1993 || La Silla || E. W. Elst || — || align=right | 2.0 km || 
|-id=750 bgcolor=#E9E9E9
| 73750 ||  || — || October 9, 1993 || La Silla || E. W. Elst || — || align=right | 5.2 km || 
|-id=751 bgcolor=#d6d6d6
| 73751 ||  || — || October 20, 1993 || La Silla || E. W. Elst || — || align=right | 6.6 km || 
|-id=752 bgcolor=#E9E9E9
| 73752 ||  || — || January 7, 1994 || Oizumi || T. Kobayashi || MAR || align=right | 3.7 km || 
|-id=753 bgcolor=#d6d6d6
| 73753 ||  || — || January 5, 1994 || Kitt Peak || Spacewatch || THM || align=right | 4.8 km || 
|-id=754 bgcolor=#fefefe
| 73754 ||  || — || January 11, 1994 || Kitt Peak || Spacewatch || FLO || align=right data-sort-value="0.93" | 930 m || 
|-id=755 bgcolor=#fefefe
| 73755 || 1994 CX || — || February 7, 1994 || Farra d'Isonzo || Farra d'Isonzo || — || align=right | 1.4 km || 
|-id=756 bgcolor=#d6d6d6
| 73756 ||  || — || February 7, 1994 || La Silla || E. W. Elst || THM || align=right | 5.9 km || 
|-id=757 bgcolor=#d6d6d6
| 73757 ||  || — || February 7, 1994 || La Silla || E. W. Elst || HYG || align=right | 8.6 km || 
|-id=758 bgcolor=#d6d6d6
| 73758 ||  || — || February 7, 1994 || La Silla || E. W. Elst || EOS || align=right | 5.2 km || 
|-id=759 bgcolor=#d6d6d6
| 73759 ||  || — || February 8, 1994 || La Silla || E. W. Elst || EOS || align=right | 5.4 km || 
|-id=760 bgcolor=#d6d6d6
| 73760 ||  || — || February 8, 1994 || La Silla || E. W. Elst || KOR || align=right | 4.0 km || 
|-id=761 bgcolor=#fefefe
| 73761 ||  || — || April 6, 1994 || Kitt Peak || Spacewatch || V || align=right | 1.4 km || 
|-id=762 bgcolor=#fefefe
| 73762 || 1994 LS || — || June 3, 1994 || Palomar || T. B. Spahr || — || align=right | 3.7 km || 
|-id=763 bgcolor=#fefefe
| 73763 ||  || — || June 2, 1994 || Kitt Peak || Spacewatch || H || align=right | 1.0 km || 
|-id=764 bgcolor=#fefefe
| 73764 ||  || — || July 4, 1994 || Caussols || E. W. Elst || — || align=right | 2.1 km || 
|-id=765 bgcolor=#E9E9E9
| 73765 ||  || — || August 10, 1994 || La Silla || E. W. Elst || MAR || align=right | 1.9 km || 
|-id=766 bgcolor=#E9E9E9
| 73766 ||  || — || August 10, 1994 || La Silla || E. W. Elst || — || align=right | 2.3 km || 
|-id=767 bgcolor=#fefefe
| 73767 Bibiandersson ||  ||  || August 10, 1994 || La Silla || E. W. Elst || H || align=right | 1.3 km || 
|-id=768 bgcolor=#E9E9E9
| 73768 ||  || — || August 10, 1994 || La Silla || E. W. Elst || — || align=right | 2.4 km || 
|-id=769 bgcolor=#d6d6d6
| 73769 Delphi ||  ||  || August 10, 1994 || La Silla || E. W. Elst || SHU3:2 || align=right | 4.8 km || 
|-id=770 bgcolor=#E9E9E9
| 73770 ||  || — || August 10, 1994 || La Silla || E. W. Elst || MAR || align=right | 2.3 km || 
|-id=771 bgcolor=#E9E9E9
| 73771 ||  || — || August 10, 1994 || La Silla || E. W. Elst || — || align=right | 2.5 km || 
|-id=772 bgcolor=#E9E9E9
| 73772 ||  || — || August 10, 1994 || La Silla || E. W. Elst || — || align=right | 3.9 km || 
|-id=773 bgcolor=#E9E9E9
| 73773 ||  || — || August 12, 1994 || La Silla || E. W. Elst || — || align=right | 6.3 km || 
|-id=774 bgcolor=#fefefe
| 73774 ||  || — || August 12, 1994 || La Silla || E. W. Elst || NYS || align=right | 2.5 km || 
|-id=775 bgcolor=#E9E9E9
| 73775 ||  || — || August 12, 1994 || La Silla || E. W. Elst || — || align=right | 2.5 km || 
|-id=776 bgcolor=#fefefe
| 73776 ||  || — || August 12, 1994 || La Silla || E. W. Elst || NYS || align=right | 4.1 km || 
|-id=777 bgcolor=#E9E9E9
| 73777 ||  || — || August 10, 1994 || La Silla || E. W. Elst || — || align=right | 1.9 km || 
|-id=778 bgcolor=#fefefe
| 73778 ||  || — || August 10, 1994 || La Silla || E. W. Elst || NYS || align=right | 2.0 km || 
|-id=779 bgcolor=#E9E9E9
| 73779 ||  || — || September 2, 1994 || Kitt Peak || Spacewatch || — || align=right | 1.8 km || 
|-id=780 bgcolor=#E9E9E9
| 73780 ||  || — || September 5, 1994 || La Silla || E. W. Elst || — || align=right | 4.0 km || 
|-id=781 bgcolor=#E9E9E9
| 73781 ||  || — || October 2, 1994 || Kitami || K. Endate, K. Watanabe || MIT || align=right | 3.5 km || 
|-id=782 bgcolor=#E9E9E9
| 73782 Yanagida ||  ||  || October 14, 1994 || Yanagida || A. Tsuchikawa, O. Muramatsu || — || align=right | 6.3 km || 
|-id=783 bgcolor=#fefefe
| 73783 ||  || — || October 28, 1994 || Kitt Peak || Spacewatch || — || align=right | 2.7 km || 
|-id=784 bgcolor=#E9E9E9
| 73784 ||  || — || November 8, 1994 || Oizumi || T. Kobayashi || — || align=right | 5.5 km || 
|-id=785 bgcolor=#E9E9E9
| 73785 ||  || — || November 27, 1994 || Oizumi || T. Kobayashi || — || align=right | 3.5 km || 
|-id=786 bgcolor=#E9E9E9
| 73786 ||  || — || November 30, 1994 || Oizumi || T. Kobayashi || — || align=right | 7.1 km || 
|-id=787 bgcolor=#E9E9E9
| 73787 ||  || — || November 26, 1994 || Kitt Peak || Spacewatch || — || align=right | 2.6 km || 
|-id=788 bgcolor=#E9E9E9
| 73788 ||  || — || January 6, 1995 || Oizumi || T. Kobayashi || — || align=right | 6.9 km || 
|-id=789 bgcolor=#E9E9E9
| 73789 ||  || — || January 28, 1995 || Kitt Peak || Spacewatch || — || align=right | 5.9 km || 
|-id=790 bgcolor=#E9E9E9
| 73790 ||  || — || January 31, 1995 || Kitt Peak || Spacewatch || AST || align=right | 5.4 km || 
|-id=791 bgcolor=#E9E9E9
| 73791 ||  || — || February 1, 1995 || Kitt Peak || Spacewatch || — || align=right | 4.5 km || 
|-id=792 bgcolor=#E9E9E9
| 73792 ||  || — || February 24, 1995 || Kitt Peak || Spacewatch || — || align=right | 4.2 km || 
|-id=793 bgcolor=#d6d6d6
| 73793 ||  || — || March 23, 1995 || Kitt Peak || Spacewatch || — || align=right | 5.7 km || 
|-id=794 bgcolor=#d6d6d6
| 73794 ||  || — || March 23, 1995 || Kitt Peak || Spacewatch || KOR || align=right | 3.5 km || 
|-id=795 bgcolor=#C2FFFF
| 73795 ||  || — || March 26, 1995 || Kitt Peak || Spacewatch || L5 || align=right | 20 km || 
|-id=796 bgcolor=#d6d6d6
| 73796 ||  || — || March 27, 1995 || Kitt Peak || Spacewatch || EOS || align=right | 3.9 km || 
|-id=797 bgcolor=#d6d6d6
| 73797 ||  || — || May 26, 1995 || Kitt Peak || Spacewatch || — || align=right | 3.6 km || 
|-id=798 bgcolor=#d6d6d6
| 73798 ||  || — || June 25, 1995 || Kitt Peak || Spacewatch || EOS || align=right | 4.0 km || 
|-id=799 bgcolor=#d6d6d6
| 73799 ||  || — || June 28, 1995 || Kitt Peak || Spacewatch || EOS || align=right | 4.4 km || 
|-id=800 bgcolor=#d6d6d6
| 73800 ||  || — || June 25, 1995 || Kitt Peak || Spacewatch || — || align=right | 4.0 km || 
|}

73801–73900 

|-bgcolor=#fefefe
| 73801 ||  || — || August 17, 1995 || Kitt Peak || Spacewatch || — || align=right | 4.5 km || 
|-id=802 bgcolor=#fefefe
| 73802 ||  || — || August 17, 1995 || Kitt Peak || Spacewatch || — || align=right | 2.1 km || 
|-id=803 bgcolor=#fefefe
| 73803 ||  || — || August 22, 1995 || Kitt Peak || Spacewatch || — || align=right | 4.7 km || 
|-id=804 bgcolor=#fefefe
| 73804 || 1995 RG || — || September 3, 1995 || Siding Spring || R. H. McNaught || H || align=right | 1.1 km || 
|-id=805 bgcolor=#fefefe
| 73805 ||  || — || September 17, 1995 || Kitt Peak || Spacewatch || NYS || align=right | 1.3 km || 
|-id=806 bgcolor=#fefefe
| 73806 ||  || — || September 19, 1995 || Kitt Peak || Spacewatch || — || align=right | 1.6 km || 
|-id=807 bgcolor=#E9E9E9
| 73807 ||  || — || September 22, 1995 || Kitami || K. Endate, K. Watanabe || — || align=right | 2.1 km || 
|-id=808 bgcolor=#fefefe
| 73808 ||  || — || September 21, 1995 || Kitt Peak || Spacewatch || MAS || align=right | 1.5 km || 
|-id=809 bgcolor=#fefefe
| 73809 ||  || — || September 26, 1995 || Kitt Peak || Spacewatch || — || align=right | 1.2 km || 
|-id=810 bgcolor=#fefefe
| 73810 ||  || — || October 24, 1995 || Kleť || Kleť Obs. || NYS || align=right | 2.0 km || 
|-id=811 bgcolor=#fefefe
| 73811 ||  || — || October 17, 1995 || Kitt Peak || Spacewatch || — || align=right | 2.3 km || 
|-id=812 bgcolor=#fefefe
| 73812 ||  || — || October 18, 1995 || Kitt Peak || Spacewatch || — || align=right | 1.6 km || 
|-id=813 bgcolor=#fefefe
| 73813 ||  || — || October 17, 1995 || Kitt Peak || Spacewatch || MAS || align=right | 1.1 km || 
|-id=814 bgcolor=#fefefe
| 73814 ||  || — || November 14, 1995 || Kitt Peak || Spacewatch || V || align=right | 1.2 km || 
|-id=815 bgcolor=#fefefe
| 73815 ||  || — || November 15, 1995 || Kitt Peak || Spacewatch || NYS || align=right | 1.5 km || 
|-id=816 bgcolor=#fefefe
| 73816 ||  || — || November 15, 1995 || Kitt Peak || Spacewatch || NYS || align=right | 1.2 km || 
|-id=817 bgcolor=#E9E9E9
| 73817 ||  || — || November 15, 1995 || Kitt Peak || Spacewatch || — || align=right | 1.4 km || 
|-id=818 bgcolor=#fefefe
| 73818 ||  || — || November 17, 1995 || Church Stretton || S. P. Laurie || — || align=right | 3.6 km || 
|-id=819 bgcolor=#fefefe
| 73819 Isaootuki ||  ||  || November 16, 1995 || Nanyo || T. Okuni || NYS || align=right | 1.9 km || 
|-id=820 bgcolor=#fefefe
| 73820 ||  || — || November 29, 1995 || Oizumi || T. Kobayashi || — || align=right | 2.3 km || 
|-id=821 bgcolor=#fefefe
| 73821 ||  || — || November 17, 1995 || Kitt Peak || Spacewatch || ERI || align=right | 3.8 km || 
|-id=822 bgcolor=#E9E9E9
| 73822 ||  || — || November 19, 1995 || Kitt Peak || Spacewatch || — || align=right | 4.1 km || 
|-id=823 bgcolor=#fefefe
| 73823 ||  || — || November 24, 1995 || Kitt Peak || Spacewatch || — || align=right | 1.5 km || 
|-id=824 bgcolor=#E9E9E9
| 73824 ||  || — || December 21, 1995 || Oizumi || T. Kobayashi || — || align=right | 2.6 km || 
|-id=825 bgcolor=#E9E9E9
| 73825 ||  || — || December 22, 1995 || Oizumi || T. Kobayashi || — || align=right | 2.2 km || 
|-id=826 bgcolor=#E9E9E9
| 73826 ||  || — || December 16, 1995 || Kitt Peak || Spacewatch || — || align=right | 1.6 km || 
|-id=827 bgcolor=#E9E9E9
| 73827 Nakanohoshinokai ||  ||  || January 12, 1996 || Kiso || I. Satō, M. Abe || MIS || align=right | 3.8 km || 
|-id=828 bgcolor=#E9E9E9
| 73828 ||  || — || January 12, 1996 || Kitt Peak || Spacewatch || — || align=right | 2.0 km || 
|-id=829 bgcolor=#E9E9E9
| 73829 ||  || — || January 15, 1996 || Kitt Peak || Spacewatch || ADE || align=right | 4.8 km || 
|-id=830 bgcolor=#E9E9E9
| 73830 ||  || — || January 15, 1996 || Kitt Peak || Spacewatch || — || align=right | 3.1 km || 
|-id=831 bgcolor=#E9E9E9
| 73831 ||  || — || January 16, 1996 || Kitt Peak || Spacewatch || WIT || align=right | 2.4 km || 
|-id=832 bgcolor=#E9E9E9
| 73832 ||  || — || January 24, 1996 || Kitt Peak || Spacewatch || — || align=right | 2.2 km || 
|-id=833 bgcolor=#E9E9E9
| 73833 ||  || — || February 12, 1996 || Oizumi || T. Kobayashi || CLO || align=right | 5.1 km || 
|-id=834 bgcolor=#E9E9E9
| 73834 ||  || — || March 12, 1996 || Kitt Peak || Spacewatch || — || align=right | 3.1 km || 
|-id=835 bgcolor=#E9E9E9
| 73835 ||  || — || March 12, 1996 || Kitt Peak || Spacewatch || MRX || align=right | 2.1 km || 
|-id=836 bgcolor=#E9E9E9
| 73836 ||  || — || March 18, 1996 || Kitt Peak || Spacewatch || — || align=right | 3.6 km || 
|-id=837 bgcolor=#E9E9E9
| 73837 ||  || — || March 17, 1996 || Kitt Peak || Spacewatch || — || align=right | 3.6 km || 
|-id=838 bgcolor=#E9E9E9
| 73838 ||  || — || April 11, 1996 || Kitt Peak || Spacewatch || — || align=right | 3.5 km || 
|-id=839 bgcolor=#E9E9E9
| 73839 ||  || — || April 13, 1996 || Kitt Peak || Spacewatch || EUN || align=right | 3.2 km || 
|-id=840 bgcolor=#E9E9E9
| 73840 ||  || — || April 11, 1996 || Kitt Peak || Spacewatch || — || align=right | 2.4 km || 
|-id=841 bgcolor=#d6d6d6
| 73841 ||  || — || April 18, 1996 || La Silla || E. W. Elst || — || align=right | 6.1 km || 
|-id=842 bgcolor=#E9E9E9
| 73842 ||  || — || April 18, 1996 || La Silla || E. W. Elst || — || align=right | 5.5 km || 
|-id=843 bgcolor=#d6d6d6
| 73843 ||  || — || May 13, 1996 || Kitt Peak || Spacewatch || KOR || align=right | 2.2 km || 
|-id=844 bgcolor=#d6d6d6
| 73844 ||  || — || August 9, 1996 || Haleakala || NEAT || ALA || align=right | 11 km || 
|-id=845 bgcolor=#d6d6d6
| 73845 ||  || — || September 6, 1996 || Mallorca || M. Blasco || — || align=right | 6.9 km || 
|-id=846 bgcolor=#fefefe
| 73846 ||  || — || September 8, 1996 || Kitt Peak || Spacewatch || — || align=right | 1.1 km || 
|-id=847 bgcolor=#d6d6d6
| 73847 ||  || — || September 15, 1996 || Kitt Peak || Spacewatch || HYG || align=right | 4.6 km || 
|-id=848 bgcolor=#fefefe
| 73848 ||  || — || September 18, 1996 || Xinglong || SCAP || — || align=right | 2.0 km || 
|-id=849 bgcolor=#fefefe
| 73849 ||  || — || October 4, 1996 || Kitt Peak || Spacewatch || FLO || align=right | 1.2 km || 
|-id=850 bgcolor=#d6d6d6
| 73850 ||  || — || October 10, 1996 || Kitt Peak || Spacewatch || HYG || align=right | 7.2 km || 
|-id=851 bgcolor=#d6d6d6
| 73851 ||  || — || October 6, 1996 || La Silla || E. W. Elst || THM || align=right | 6.5 km || 
|-id=852 bgcolor=#fefefe
| 73852 ||  || — || November 7, 1996 || Xinglong || SCAP || — || align=right | 1.9 km || 
|-id=853 bgcolor=#fefefe
| 73853 ||  || — || November 6, 1996 || Kitt Peak || Spacewatch || — || align=right | 1.7 km || 
|-id=854 bgcolor=#fefefe
| 73854 ||  || — || November 10, 1996 || Kitt Peak || Spacewatch || FLO || align=right | 1.3 km || 
|-id=855 bgcolor=#fefefe
| 73855 ||  || — || November 7, 1996 || Kushiro || S. Ueda, H. Kaneda || — || align=right | 2.4 km || 
|-id=856 bgcolor=#fefefe
| 73856 || 1996 WF || — || November 16, 1996 || Sudbury || D. di Cicco || — || align=right | 3.3 km || 
|-id=857 bgcolor=#fefefe
| 73857 Hitaneichi ||  ||  || November 16, 1996 || Nanyo || T. Okuni || — || align=right | 2.2 km || 
|-id=858 bgcolor=#fefefe
| 73858 ||  || — || December 1, 1996 || Kitt Peak || Spacewatch || FLO || align=right | 1.6 km || 
|-id=859 bgcolor=#fefefe
| 73859 ||  || — || December 7, 1996 || Oizumi || T. Kobayashi || — || align=right | 2.4 km || 
|-id=860 bgcolor=#fefefe
| 73860 ||  || — || December 7, 1996 || Oizumi || T. Kobayashi || ERI || align=right | 3.8 km || 
|-id=861 bgcolor=#fefefe
| 73861 ||  || — || December 8, 1996 || Oizumi || T. Kobayashi || — || align=right | 1.9 km || 
|-id=862 bgcolor=#fefefe
| 73862 Mochigasechugaku ||  ||  || December 15, 1996 || Saji || Saji Obs. || V || align=right | 1.3 km || 
|-id=863 bgcolor=#fefefe
| 73863 ||  || — || December 8, 1996 || Xinglong || SCAP || FLO || align=right | 2.8 km || 
|-id=864 bgcolor=#fefefe
| 73864 ||  || — || December 29, 1996 || Oizumi || T. Kobayashi || — || align=right | 1.9 km || 
|-id=865 bgcolor=#FA8072
| 73865 || 1997 AW || — || January 2, 1997 || Oizumi || T. Kobayashi || — || align=right | 2.0 km || 
|-id=866 bgcolor=#fefefe
| 73866 ||  || — || January 2, 1997 || Oizumi || T. Kobayashi || — || align=right | 2.1 km || 
|-id=867 bgcolor=#E9E9E9
| 73867 ||  || — || January 2, 1997 || Chichibu || N. Satō || — || align=right | 2.5 km || 
|-id=868 bgcolor=#fefefe
| 73868 ||  || — || January 1, 1997 || Prescott || P. G. Comba || FLO || align=right | 1.6 km || 
|-id=869 bgcolor=#fefefe
| 73869 ||  || — || January 2, 1997 || Kitt Peak || Spacewatch || NYS || align=right | 1.3 km || 
|-id=870 bgcolor=#fefefe
| 73870 ||  || — || January 13, 1997 || Haleakala || NEAT || FLO || align=right | 1.1 km || 
|-id=871 bgcolor=#fefefe
| 73871 ||  || — || January 14, 1997 || Kleť || Kleť Obs. || FLO || align=right | 1.3 km || 
|-id=872 bgcolor=#fefefe
| 73872 Stefanoragazzi ||  ||  || January 7, 1997 || Colleverde || V. S. Casulli || — || align=right | 1.6 km || 
|-id=873 bgcolor=#fefefe
| 73873 ||  || — || January 28, 1997 || Oizumi || T. Kobayashi || — || align=right | 2.0 km || 
|-id=874 bgcolor=#fefefe
| 73874 ||  || — || January 29, 1997 || Oizumi || T. Kobayashi || — || align=right | 1.3 km || 
|-id=875 bgcolor=#fefefe
| 73875 ||  || — || January 31, 1997 || Kitt Peak || Spacewatch || NYS || align=right | 1.6 km || 
|-id=876 bgcolor=#E9E9E9
| 73876 || 1997 CT || — || February 1, 1997 || Oizumi || T. Kobayashi || — || align=right | 2.8 km || 
|-id=877 bgcolor=#fefefe
| 73877 ||  || — || February 4, 1997 || Haleakala || NEAT || NYS || align=right | 1.4 km || 
|-id=878 bgcolor=#fefefe
| 73878 ||  || — || February 6, 1997 || Haleakala || NEAT || — || align=right | 2.0 km || 
|-id=879 bgcolor=#fefefe
| 73879 ||  || — || February 1, 1997 || Kitt Peak || Spacewatch || — || align=right | 4.6 km || 
|-id=880 bgcolor=#fefefe
| 73880 ||  || — || February 6, 1997 || Kitt Peak || Spacewatch || NYS || align=right | 1.7 km || 
|-id=881 bgcolor=#fefefe
| 73881 ||  || — || February 13, 1997 || Oizumi || T. Kobayashi || NYS || align=right | 1.8 km || 
|-id=882 bgcolor=#fefefe
| 73882 ||  || — || February 11, 1997 || Oizumi || T. Kobayashi || NYS || align=right | 2.9 km || 
|-id=883 bgcolor=#fefefe
| 73883 Asteraude || 1997 DQ ||  || February 16, 1997 || Castres || A. Klotz || — || align=right | 2.1 km || 
|-id=884 bgcolor=#fefefe
| 73884 || 1997 EG || — || March 1, 1997 || Oizumi || T. Kobayashi || FLO || align=right | 3.2 km || 
|-id=885 bgcolor=#fefefe
| 73885 Kalaymoodley || 1997 EV ||  || March 1, 1997 || Campo Imperatore || A. Boattini || PHO || align=right | 3.3 km || 
|-id=886 bgcolor=#d6d6d6
| 73886 ||  || — || March 4, 1997 || Kitt Peak || Spacewatch || SHU3:2 || align=right | 9.1 km || 
|-id=887 bgcolor=#fefefe
| 73887 ||  || — || March 3, 1997 || Kitt Peak || Spacewatch || V || align=right | 1.7 km || 
|-id=888 bgcolor=#fefefe
| 73888 ||  || — || March 3, 1997 || Kitt Peak || Spacewatch || — || align=right | 6.2 km || 
|-id=889 bgcolor=#E9E9E9
| 73889 ||  || — || March 3, 1997 || Kitt Peak || Spacewatch || EUN || align=right | 3.3 km || 
|-id=890 bgcolor=#fefefe
| 73890 ||  || — || March 5, 1997 || Kitt Peak || Spacewatch || NYS || align=right | 1.8 km || 
|-id=891 bgcolor=#E9E9E9
| 73891 Pietromennea ||  ||  || March 10, 1997 || Colleverde || V. S. Casulli || — || align=right | 2.2 km || 
|-id=892 bgcolor=#E9E9E9
| 73892 ||  || — || March 5, 1997 || Oohira || T. Urata || — || align=right | 2.2 km || 
|-id=893 bgcolor=#fefefe
| 73893 ||  || — || March 4, 1997 || Socorro || LINEAR || — || align=right | 1.8 km || 
|-id=894 bgcolor=#fefefe
| 73894 ||  || — || March 4, 1997 || Socorro || LINEAR || NYS || align=right | 3.4 km || 
|-id=895 bgcolor=#fefefe
| 73895 ||  || — || March 4, 1997 || Socorro || LINEAR || — || align=right | 1.8 km || 
|-id=896 bgcolor=#fefefe
| 73896 ||  || — || March 4, 1997 || Socorro || LINEAR || — || align=right | 1.9 km || 
|-id=897 bgcolor=#fefefe
| 73897 ||  || — || March 5, 1997 || Socorro || LINEAR || V || align=right | 1.6 km || 
|-id=898 bgcolor=#E9E9E9
| 73898 ||  || — || March 10, 1997 || Socorro || LINEAR || — || align=right | 2.2 km || 
|-id=899 bgcolor=#fefefe
| 73899 ||  || — || March 5, 1997 || La Silla || E. W. Elst || MAS || align=right | 1.5 km || 
|-id=900 bgcolor=#fefefe
| 73900 || 1997 FD || — || March 19, 1997 || Cloudcroft || W. Offutt || — || align=right | 1.8 km || 
|}

73901–74000 

|-bgcolor=#fefefe
| 73901 ||  || — || March 31, 1997 || Socorro || LINEAR || — || align=right | 3.8 km || 
|-id=902 bgcolor=#fefefe
| 73902 ||  || — || April 2, 1997 || Socorro || LINEAR || MAS || align=right | 1.6 km || 
|-id=903 bgcolor=#fefefe
| 73903 ||  || — || April 3, 1997 || Socorro || LINEAR || — || align=right | 1.9 km || 
|-id=904 bgcolor=#fefefe
| 73904 ||  || — || April 3, 1997 || Socorro || LINEAR || — || align=right | 2.0 km || 
|-id=905 bgcolor=#fefefe
| 73905 ||  || — || April 3, 1997 || Socorro || LINEAR || NYS || align=right | 1.2 km || 
|-id=906 bgcolor=#fefefe
| 73906 ||  || — || April 3, 1997 || Socorro || LINEAR || NYS || align=right | 1.6 km || 
|-id=907 bgcolor=#fefefe
| 73907 ||  || — || April 3, 1997 || Socorro || LINEAR || — || align=right | 1.7 km || 
|-id=908 bgcolor=#E9E9E9
| 73908 ||  || — || April 3, 1997 || Socorro || LINEAR || — || align=right | 5.1 km || 
|-id=909 bgcolor=#E9E9E9
| 73909 ||  || — || April 3, 1997 || Socorro || LINEAR || — || align=right | 2.5 km || 
|-id=910 bgcolor=#fefefe
| 73910 ||  || — || April 6, 1997 || Socorro || LINEAR || — || align=right | 2.4 km || 
|-id=911 bgcolor=#fefefe
| 73911 ||  || — || April 6, 1997 || Socorro || LINEAR || NYS || align=right | 1.5 km || 
|-id=912 bgcolor=#fefefe
| 73912 ||  || — || April 8, 1997 || Kitt Peak || Spacewatch || MAS || align=right | 1.5 km || 
|-id=913 bgcolor=#fefefe
| 73913 ||  || — || April 6, 1997 || Socorro || LINEAR || V || align=right | 1.6 km || 
|-id=914 bgcolor=#fefefe
| 73914 ||  || — || April 7, 1997 || La Silla || E. W. Elst || V || align=right | 2.0 km || 
|-id=915 bgcolor=#fefefe
| 73915 ||  || — || April 3, 1997 || Socorro || LINEAR || NYS || align=right | 1.4 km || 
|-id=916 bgcolor=#fefefe
| 73916 ||  || — || April 27, 1997 || Kitt Peak || Spacewatch || — || align=right | 1.5 km || 
|-id=917 bgcolor=#E9E9E9
| 73917 ||  || — || April 28, 1997 || Kitt Peak || Spacewatch || — || align=right | 3.9 km || 
|-id=918 bgcolor=#E9E9E9
| 73918 ||  || — || April 30, 1997 || Socorro || LINEAR || XIZ || align=right | 3.9 km || 
|-id=919 bgcolor=#E9E9E9
| 73919 ||  || — || April 30, 1997 || Socorro || LINEAR || — || align=right | 2.2 km || 
|-id=920 bgcolor=#E9E9E9
| 73920 ||  || — || April 30, 1997 || Socorro || LINEAR || — || align=right | 4.3 km || 
|-id=921 bgcolor=#E9E9E9
| 73921 ||  || — || June 7, 1997 || Kitt Peak || Spacewatch || PAD || align=right | 4.4 km || 
|-id=922 bgcolor=#E9E9E9
| 73922 ||  || — || June 7, 1997 || La Silla || E. W. Elst || — || align=right | 2.7 km || 
|-id=923 bgcolor=#E9E9E9
| 73923 ||  || — || June 30, 1997 || Prescott || P. G. Comba || — || align=right | 6.1 km || 
|-id=924 bgcolor=#fefefe
| 73924 ||  || — || June 28, 1997 || Socorro || LINEAR || H || align=right | 1.5 km || 
|-id=925 bgcolor=#E9E9E9
| 73925 ||  || — || June 28, 1997 || Kitt Peak || Spacewatch || — || align=right | 4.3 km || 
|-id=926 bgcolor=#d6d6d6
| 73926 ||  || — || June 26, 1997 || Kitt Peak || Spacewatch || EOS || align=right | 4.2 km || 
|-id=927 bgcolor=#E9E9E9
| 73927 ||  || — || June 28, 1997 || Socorro || LINEAR || — || align=right | 3.1 km || 
|-id=928 bgcolor=#E9E9E9
| 73928 ||  || — || July 3, 1997 || Kitt Peak || Spacewatch || — || align=right | 5.9 km || 
|-id=929 bgcolor=#d6d6d6
| 73929 ||  || — || July 28, 1997 || Kitt Peak || Spacewatch || — || align=right | 3.9 km || 
|-id=930 bgcolor=#E9E9E9
| 73930 || 1997 PV || — || August 3, 1997 || Caussols || ODAS || — || align=right | 6.0 km || 
|-id=931 bgcolor=#d6d6d6
| 73931 ||  || — || August 3, 1997 || Xinglong || SCAP || — || align=right | 5.4 km || 
|-id=932 bgcolor=#d6d6d6
| 73932 ||  || — || August 25, 1997 || Reedy Creek || J. Broughton || ALA || align=right | 10 km || 
|-id=933 bgcolor=#d6d6d6
| 73933 ||  || — || September 3, 1997 || Caussols || ODAS || LIX || align=right | 7.7 km || 
|-id=934 bgcolor=#d6d6d6
| 73934 ||  || — || September 24, 1997 || Ondřejov || L. Kotková || — || align=right | 6.2 km || 
|-id=935 bgcolor=#d6d6d6
| 73935 ||  || — || September 26, 1997 || Kleť || Kleť Obs. || EOS || align=right | 3.9 km || 
|-id=936 bgcolor=#d6d6d6
| 73936 Takeyamamoto ||  ||  || September 24, 1997 || Moriyama || Y. Ikari || — || align=right | 8.3 km || 
|-id=937 bgcolor=#d6d6d6
| 73937 ||  || — || September 23, 1997 || Kitt Peak || Spacewatch || — || align=right | 3.0 km || 
|-id=938 bgcolor=#d6d6d6
| 73938 ||  || — || September 23, 1997 || Kitt Peak || Spacewatch || — || align=right | 6.2 km || 
|-id=939 bgcolor=#E9E9E9
| 73939 ||  || — || September 26, 1997 || Xinglong || SCAP || — || align=right | 3.9 km || 
|-id=940 bgcolor=#d6d6d6
| 73940 ||  || — || September 27, 1997 || Oizumi || T. Kobayashi || — || align=right | 4.5 km || 
|-id=941 bgcolor=#d6d6d6
| 73941 ||  || — || September 27, 1997 || Kitt Peak || Spacewatch || THM || align=right | 3.9 km || 
|-id=942 bgcolor=#d6d6d6
| 73942 ||  || — || September 27, 1997 || Kitt Peak || Spacewatch || — || align=right | 3.6 km || 
|-id=943 bgcolor=#d6d6d6
| 73943 ||  || — || September 28, 1997 || Kitt Peak || Spacewatch || HYG || align=right | 5.5 km || 
|-id=944 bgcolor=#d6d6d6
| 73944 ||  || — || September 30, 1997 || Kitt Peak || Spacewatch || — || align=right | 5.5 km || 
|-id=945 bgcolor=#d6d6d6
| 73945 ||  || — || September 28, 1997 || Kitt Peak || Spacewatch || — || align=right | 8.4 km || 
|-id=946 bgcolor=#d6d6d6
| 73946 ||  || — || September 24, 1997 || Bergisch Gladbach || W. Bickel || — || align=right | 5.2 km || 
|-id=947 bgcolor=#d6d6d6
| 73947 ||  || — || October 3, 1997 || Caussols || ODAS || HYG || align=right | 7.0 km || 
|-id=948 bgcolor=#d6d6d6
| 73948 ||  || — || October 2, 1997 || Kitt Peak || Spacewatch || — || align=right | 6.2 km || 
|-id=949 bgcolor=#d6d6d6
| 73949 ||  || — || October 2, 1997 || Kitt Peak || Spacewatch || — || align=right | 6.9 km || 
|-id=950 bgcolor=#d6d6d6
| 73950 ||  || — || October 3, 1997 || Kitt Peak || Spacewatch || KAR || align=right | 2.4 km || 
|-id=951 bgcolor=#d6d6d6
| 73951 ||  || — || October 21, 1997 || Church Stretton || S. P. Laurie || — || align=right | 7.5 km || 
|-id=952 bgcolor=#d6d6d6
| 73952 ||  || — || October 25, 1997 || Kitt Peak || Spacewatch || — || align=right | 4.6 km || 
|-id=953 bgcolor=#d6d6d6
| 73953 ||  || — || October 27, 1997 || Haleakala || AMOS || — || align=right | 5.5 km || 
|-id=954 bgcolor=#d6d6d6
| 73954 ||  || — || October 20, 1997 || Xinglong || SCAP || HYG || align=right | 6.1 km || 
|-id=955 bgcolor=#d6d6d6
| 73955 Asaka ||  ||  || October 22, 1997 || Saji || Saji Obs. || — || align=right | 6.6 km || 
|-id=956 bgcolor=#d6d6d6
| 73956 ||  || — || November 5, 1997 || Nachi-Katsuura || Y. Shimizu, T. Urata || — || align=right | 8.2 km || 
|-id=957 bgcolor=#d6d6d6
| 73957 ||  || — || November 2, 1997 || Xinglong || SCAP || — || align=right | 5.9 km || 
|-id=958 bgcolor=#d6d6d6
| 73958 || 1997 WN || — || November 18, 1997 || Oizumi || T. Kobayashi || — || align=right | 10 km || 
|-id=959 bgcolor=#d6d6d6
| 73959 ||  || — || November 22, 1997 || Kitt Peak || Spacewatch || THM || align=right | 7.2 km || 
|-id=960 bgcolor=#d6d6d6
| 73960 ||  || — || November 23, 1997 || Oizumi || T. Kobayashi || — || align=right | 8.8 km || 
|-id=961 bgcolor=#d6d6d6
| 73961 ||  || — || November 30, 1997 || Kitt Peak || Spacewatch || Tj (2.97) || align=right | 14 km || 
|-id=962 bgcolor=#d6d6d6
| 73962 ||  || — || November 29, 1997 || Socorro || LINEAR || — || align=right | 5.4 km || 
|-id=963 bgcolor=#d6d6d6
| 73963 ||  || — || November 29, 1997 || Socorro || LINEAR || — || align=right | 9.6 km || 
|-id=964 bgcolor=#d6d6d6
| 73964 ||  || — || November 29, 1997 || Socorro || LINEAR || — || align=right | 5.2 km || 
|-id=965 bgcolor=#d6d6d6
| 73965 ||  || — || December 6, 1997 || Caussols || ODAS || URS || align=right | 11 km || 
|-id=966 bgcolor=#d6d6d6
| 73966 ||  || — || December 6, 1997 || Cloudcroft || W. Offutt || — || align=right | 4.0 km || 
|-id=967 bgcolor=#d6d6d6
| 73967 ||  || — || December 4, 1997 || Xinglong || SCAP || HYG || align=right | 7.8 km || 
|-id=968 bgcolor=#d6d6d6
| 73968 ||  || — || December 24, 1997 || Chichibu || N. Satō || — || align=right | 9.9 km || 
|-id=969 bgcolor=#d6d6d6
| 73969 ||  || — || December 21, 1997 || Kitt Peak || Spacewatch || — || align=right | 9.9 km || 
|-id=970 bgcolor=#fefefe
| 73970 ||  || — || January 5, 1998 || Xinglong || SCAP || — || align=right | 1.8 km || 
|-id=971 bgcolor=#fefefe
| 73971 ||  || — || January 25, 1998 || Oizumi || T. Kobayashi || FLO || align=right | 4.0 km || 
|-id=972 bgcolor=#d6d6d6
| 73972 ||  || — || January 22, 1998 || Kitt Peak || Spacewatch || — || align=right | 10 km || 
|-id=973 bgcolor=#fefefe
| 73973 ||  || — || January 23, 1998 || Kitt Peak || Spacewatch || — || align=right | 2.2 km || 
|-id=974 bgcolor=#d6d6d6
| 73974 ||  || — || January 29, 1998 || Modra || P. Kolény, L. Kornoš || URS || align=right | 10 km || 
|-id=975 bgcolor=#d6d6d6
| 73975 ||  || — || January 18, 1998 || Kitt Peak || Spacewatch || — || align=right | 3.8 km || 
|-id=976 bgcolor=#d6d6d6
| 73976 ||  || — || January 26, 1998 || Kitt Peak || Spacewatch || — || align=right | 9.7 km || 
|-id=977 bgcolor=#d6d6d6
| 73977 ||  || — || January 20, 1998 || Socorro || LINEAR || — || align=right | 11 km || 
|-id=978 bgcolor=#fefefe
| 73978 ||  || — || February 17, 1998 || Kitt Peak || Spacewatch || — || align=right | 1.8 km || 
|-id=979 bgcolor=#fefefe
| 73979 ||  || — || February 21, 1998 || Xinglong || SCAP || — || align=right | 1.6 km || 
|-id=980 bgcolor=#fefefe
| 73980 ||  || — || February 23, 1998 || Kitt Peak || Spacewatch || NYS || align=right | 2.9 km || 
|-id=981 bgcolor=#fefefe
| 73981 ||  || — || February 25, 1998 || Haleakala || NEAT || FLO || align=right | 1.8 km || 
|-id=982 bgcolor=#d6d6d6
| 73982 ||  || — || February 23, 1998 || Kitt Peak || Spacewatch || TIR || align=right | 7.6 km || 
|-id=983 bgcolor=#d6d6d6
| 73983 ||  || — || February 26, 1998 || Kitt Peak || Spacewatch || 7:4 || align=right | 12 km || 
|-id=984 bgcolor=#fefefe
| 73984 Claudebernard ||  ||  || February 26, 1998 || Blauvac || R. Roy || — || align=right | 2.6 km || 
|-id=985 bgcolor=#fefefe
| 73985 ||  || — || February 23, 1998 || Kitt Peak || Spacewatch || — || align=right | 1.6 km || 
|-id=986 bgcolor=#fefefe
| 73986 ||  || — || February 28, 1998 || Kitt Peak || Spacewatch || FLO || align=right | 1.6 km || 
|-id=987 bgcolor=#fefefe
| 73987 ||  || — || March 2, 1998 || Caussols || ODAS || FLO || align=right | 1.7 km || 
|-id=988 bgcolor=#fefefe
| 73988 ||  || — || March 1, 1998 || La Silla || E. W. Elst || — || align=right | 2.5 km || 
|-id=989 bgcolor=#fefefe
| 73989 ||  || — || March 1, 1998 || La Silla || E. W. Elst || V || align=right | 2.2 km || 
|-id=990 bgcolor=#fefefe
| 73990 ||  || — || March 1, 1998 || La Silla || E. W. Elst || FLO || align=right | 2.2 km || 
|-id=991 bgcolor=#fefefe
| 73991 || 1998 FP || — || March 18, 1998 || Kitt Peak || Spacewatch || MAS || align=right | 1.3 km || 
|-id=992 bgcolor=#fefefe
| 73992 ||  || — || March 20, 1998 || Woomera || F. B. Zoltowski || FLO || align=right | 1.7 km || 
|-id=993 bgcolor=#fefefe
| 73993 ||  || — || March 22, 1998 || Prescott || P. G. Comba || — || align=right | 2.0 km || 
|-id=994 bgcolor=#fefefe
| 73994 ||  || — || March 20, 1998 || Socorro || LINEAR || — || align=right | 1.8 km || 
|-id=995 bgcolor=#d6d6d6
| 73995 ||  || — || March 20, 1998 || Socorro || LINEAR || 7:4 || align=right | 7.4 km || 
|-id=996 bgcolor=#d6d6d6
| 73996 ||  || — || March 20, 1998 || Socorro || LINEAR || TIR || align=right | 7.2 km || 
|-id=997 bgcolor=#fefefe
| 73997 ||  || — || March 20, 1998 || Socorro || LINEAR || — || align=right | 1.6 km || 
|-id=998 bgcolor=#fefefe
| 73998 ||  || — || March 20, 1998 || Socorro || LINEAR || — || align=right | 1.7 km || 
|-id=999 bgcolor=#fefefe
| 73999 ||  || — || March 20, 1998 || Socorro || LINEAR || — || align=right | 3.6 km || 
|-id=000 bgcolor=#fefefe
| 74000 ||  || — || March 20, 1998 || Socorro || LINEAR || NYS || align=right | 1.6 km || 
|}

References

External links 
 Discovery Circumstances: Numbered Minor Planets (70001)–(75000) (IAU Minor Planet Center)

0073